There are over 2,154 species of Coleoptera (beetles) native to Ireland. These are disposed in 84 families. By contrast there are 4,034 species of Coleoptera in the British Isles, consisting of 106 families . The largest beetle families in Ireland are the rove beetles (Staphylinidae) with 641 species, the weevils (Curculionidae) with 214 species, and the ground beetles (Carabidae) with 210 species.

Suborder Adephaga (adephagans)

Family Carabidae (ground beetles)

Cicindelinae Latreille, 1802

Cicindela campestris Linnaeus, 1758

Brachininae Bonelli, 1810
Brachinus crepitans (Linnaeus, 1758)

Carabinae Latreille, 1802

Carabini Latreille, 1802
Calosoma inquisitor (Linnaeus, 1758)
Carabus clathratus Linnaeus, 1761
Carabus arvensis  Herbst, 1784
Carabus granulatus Linnaeus, 1758
Carabus monilis Fabricius, 1792
Carabus nemoralis O. F. Müller, 1764
Carabus nitens Linnaeus, 1758
Carabus glabratus Paykull, 1790
Carabus problematicus Herbst, 1786
Cychrus caraboides (Linnaeus, 1758)
Nebriini Laporte, 1834
Leistus montanus Stephens, 1827
Leistus rufomarginatus (Duftschmid, 1812)
Leistus fulvibarbis Dejean, 1826
Leistus terminatus (Hellwig in Panzer, 1793)
Nebria brevicollis (Fabricius, 1792)
Nebria salina Fairmaire & Laboulbène, 1854
Nebria rufescens (Ström, 1768)
Eurynebria complanata (Linnaeus, 1767)
Pelophila borealis (Paykull, 1790)
Notiophilini Motschulsky, 1850
Notiophilus aestuans Motschulsky, 1864
Notiophilus aquaticus (Linnaeus, 1758)
Notiophilus biguttatus (Fabricius, 1779)
Notiophilus germinyi Fauvel, 1863
Notiophilus palustris (Duftschmid, 1812)
Notiophilus rufipes Curtis, 1829
Notiophilus substriatus G. R. Waterhouse, 1833
Elaphrini Latreille, 1802
Blethisa multipunctata (Linnaeus, 1758)
Elaphrus cupreus Duftschmid, 1812
Elaphrus uliginosus Fabricius, 1792
Elaphrus riparius (Linnaeus, 1758)
Loricerini Bonelli, 1810
Loricera pilicornis (Fabricius, 1775)
Clivina fossor (Linnaeus, 1758)
Dyschirius obscurus (Gyllenhal, 1827)
Dyschirius thoracicus (Rossi, 1790)
Dyschirius globosus (Herbst, 1784)
Dyschirius impunctipennis Dawson, 1854
Dyschirius politus (Dejean, 1825)
Dyschirius salinus Schaum, 1843
Broscini Hope, 1838
Broscus cephalotes (Linnaeus, 1758)
Miscodera arctica (Paykull, 1798)
Trechini Bonelli, 1810
Perileptus areolatus (Creutzer, 1799)
Aepus marinus (Ström, 1783)
Aepus robinii (Laboulbène, 1849)
Trechus rivularis (Gyllenhal, 1810)
Trechus fulvus Dejean, 1831
Trechus obtusus Erichson, 1837
Trechus quadristriatus (Schrank, 1781)
Trechus rubens (Fabricius, 1792)
Trechus subnotatus Dejean, 1831
Blemus discus (Fabricius, 1792)
Trechoblemus micros (Herbst, 1784)
Tachys micros (Fischer von Waldheim, 1828)
Asaphidion curtum (Heyden, 1870)
Asaphidion flavipes (Linnaeus, 1761)
Asaphidion pallipes (Duftschmid, 1812)
Ocys harpaloides (Audinet-Serville, 1821)
Cillenus lateralis Samouelle, 1819
Bracteon argenteolum (Ahrens, 1812)
Bembidion lampros (Herbst, 1784)
Bembidion punctulatum Drapiez, 1821
Bembidion pallidipenne (Illiger, 1802)
Bembidion bipunctatum (Linnaeus, 1761)
Bembidion dentellum (Thunberg, 1787)
Bembidion varium (Olivier, 1795)
Bembidion geniculatum Heer, 1837/8
Bembidion tibiale (Duftschmid, 1812)
Bembidion bruxellense Wesmael, 1835
Bembidion bualei Jacquelin du Val, 1852
Bembidion decorum (Zenker in Panzer, 1800)
Bembidion deletum Audinet-Serville, 1821
Bembidion femoratum Sturm, 1825
Bembidion lunatum (Duftschmid, 1812)
Bembidion maritimum (Stephens, 1835)
Bembidion monticola Sturm, 1825
Bembidion saxatile Gyllenhal, 1827
Bembidion stephensii Crotch, 1866
Bembidion tetracolum Say, 1825
Bembidion illigeri Netolitzky, 1914
Bembidion gilvipes Sturm, 1825
Bembidion assimile Gyllenhal, 1810
Bembidion clarkii (Dawson, 1849)
Bembidion fumigatum (Duftschmid, 1812)
Bembidion minimum (Fabricius, 1792)
Bembidion normannum Dejean, 1831
Bembidion doris (Panzer, 1796)
Bembidion obtusum Audinet-Serville, 1821
Bembidion aeneum Germar, 1824
Bembidion guttula (Fabricius, 1792)
Bembidion lunulatum (Geoffroy in Fourcroy, 1785)
Bembidion mannerheimii C. R. Sahlberg, 1827
Pogonus chalceus (Marsham, 1802)
Pogonus littoralis (Duftschmid, 1812)
Patrobini Kirby, 1837
Patrobus assimilis Chaudoir, 1844
Patrobus atrorufus (Ström, 1768)
Patrobus septentrionis Dejean, 1828
Pterostichini Bonelli, 1810
Stomis pumicatus (Panzer, 1795)
Poecilus cupreus (Linnaeus, 1758)
Poecilus versicolor (Sturm, 1824)
Pterostichus aethiops (Panzer, 1796)
Pterostichus madidus (Fabricius, 1775)
Pterostichus aterrimus (Herbst, 1784)
Pterostichus niger (Schaller, 1783)
Pterostichus adstrictus Eschscholtz, 1823
Pterostichus oblongopunctatus (Fabricius, 1787)
Pterostichus melanarius (Illiger, 1798)
Pterostichus anthracinus (Panzer, 1795)
Pterostichus gracilis (Dejean, 1828)
Pterostichus minor (Gyllenhal, 1827)
Pterostichus nigrita (Paykull, 1790)
Pterostichus rhaeticus Heer, 1837/8
Pterostichus vernalis (Panzer, 1795)
Pterostichus diligens (Sturm, 1824)
Pterostichus strenuus (Panzer, 1796)
Abax parallelepipedus (Piller & Mitterpacher, 1783)
Sphodrini Laporte, 1834
Platyderus depressus (Audinet-Serville, 1821)
Synuchus vivalis (Illiger, 1798)
Calathus rotundicollis Dejean, 1828
Calathus cinctus Motschulsky, 1850
Calathus erratus (C. R. Sahlberg, 1827)
Calathus fuscipes (Goeze, 1777)
Calathus melanocephalus (Linnaeus, 1758)
Calathus micropterus (Duftschmid, 1812)
Calathus mollis (Marsham, 1802)
Sphodrus leucophthalmus (Linnaeus, 1758)
Laemostenus complanatus (Dejean, 1828)
Laemostenus terricola (Herbst, 1784)
Olisthopus rotundatus (Paykull, 1790)
Oxypselaphus obscurus (Herbst, 1784)
Paranchus albipes (Fabricius, 1796)
Anchomenus dorsalis (Pontoppidan, 1763)
Batenus livens (Gyllenhal, 1810)
Agonum fuliginosum (Panzer, 1809)
Agonum gracile Sturm, 1824
Agonum micans Nicolai, 1822
Agonum piceum (Linnaeus, 1758)
Agonum thoreyi Dejean, 1828
Agonum lugens (Duftschmid, 1812)
Agonum marginatum (Linnaeus, 1758)
Agonum muelleri (Herbst, 1784)
Agonum nigrum Dejean, 1828
Agonum versutum Sturm, 1824
Agonum viduum (Panzer, 1796)
Amara plebeja (Gyllenhal, 1810)
Amara aenea (De Geer, 1774)
Amara communis (Panzer, 1797)
Amara convexior Stephens, 1828
Amara familiaris (Duftschmid, 1812)
Amara lucida (Duftschmid, 1812)
Amara lunicollis Schiødte, 1837
Amara montivaga Sturm, 1825
Amara ovata (Fabricius, 1792)
Amara similata (Gyllenhal, 1810)
Amara tibialis (Paykull, 1798)
Amara bifrons (Gyllenhal, 1810)
Amara praetermissa (C. R. Sahlberg, 1827)
Amara apricaria (Paykull, 1790)
Amara consularis (Duftschmid, 1812)
Amara fulva (O. F. Müller, 1776)
Curtonotus aulicus (Panzer, 1796)
Curtonotus convexiusculus (Marsham, 1802)
Harpalini Bonelli, 1810
Harpalus rufipes (De Geer, 1774)
Harpalus affinis (Schrank, 1781)
Harpalus anxius (Duftschmid, 1812)
Harpalus laevipes Zetterstedt, 1828
Harpalus latus (Linnaeus, 1758)
Harpalus rubripes (Duftschmid, 1812)
Harpalus rufipalpis Sturm, 1818
Harpalus tardus (Panzer, 1796)
Ophonus puncticeps Stephens, 1828
Ophonus rufibarbis (Fabricius, 1792)
Anisodactylus binotatus (Fabricius, 1787)
Anisodactylus nemorivagus (Duftschmid, 1812)
Dicheirotrichus gustavii Crotch, 1871
Trichocellus cognatus (Gyllenhal, 1827)
Trichocellus placidus (Gyllenhal, 1827)
Bradycellus caucasicus (Chaudoir, 1846)
Bradycellus harpalinus (Audinet-Serville, 1821)
Bradycellus ruficollis (Stephens, 1828)
Bradycellus sharpi Joy, 1912
Bradycellus verbasci (Duftschmid, 1812)
Stenolophus mixtus (Herbst, 1784)
Acupalpus dubius Schilsky, 1888
Acupalpus parvulus (Sturm, 1825)
Anthracus consputus (Duftschmid, 1812)
Chlaenius nigricornis (Fabricius, 1787)
Chlaenius tristis (Schaller, 1783)
Chlaenius vestitus (Paykull, 1790)
Licinini Bonelli, 1810
Badister bullatus (Schrank, 1798)
Badister meridionalis Puel, 1925
Badister unipustulatus Bonelli, 1813
Badister sodalis (Duftschmid, 1812)
Badister collaris Motschulsky, 1844
Badister dilatatus Chaudoir, 1837
Badister peltatus (Panzer, 1797)
Panagaeini Bonelli, 1810
Panagaeus cruxmajor (Linnaeus, 1758)
Masoreini Chaudoir, 1870
Lebia chlorocephala (J. Hoffmann, 1803)
Lebia cruxminor (Linnaeus, 1758)
Demetrias atricapillus (Linnaeus, 1758)
Cymindis vaporariorum (Linnaeus, 1758)
Paradromius linearis (Olivier, 1795)
Dromius meridionalis Dejean, 1825
Dromius quadrimaculatus (Linnaeus, 1758)
Calodromius spilotus (Illiger, 1798)
Philorhizus melanocephalus (Dejean, 1825)
Philorhizus notatus (Stephens, 1827)
Syntomus foveatus (Geoffroy in Fourcroy, 1785)
Syntomus truncatellus (Linnaeus, 1761)

Family Dytiscidae (predaceous diving beetles, water tigers)

Agabus arcticus (Paykull, 1798)
Agabus congener (Thunberg, 1794)
Agabus sturmii (Gyllenhal, 1808)
Agabus labiatus (Brahm, 1790)
Agabus affinis (Paykull, 1798)
Agabus biguttatus (Olivier, 1795)
Agabus bipustulatus (Linnaeus, 1767)
Agabus conspersus (Marsham, 1802)
Agabus guttatus (Paykull, 1798)
Agabus nebulosus (Forster, 1771)
Agabus paludosus (Fabricius, 1801)
Agabus unguicularis (Thomson, 1867)
Ilybius aenescens Thomson, 1870
Ilybius ater (DeGeer, 1774)
Ilybius chalconatus (Panzer, 1796)
Ilybius fuliginosus (Fabricius, 1792)
Ilybius guttiger (Gyllenhal, 1808)
Ilybius montanus (Stephens, 1828)
Ilybius quadriguttatus (Lacordaire, 1835)
Ilybius subaeneus Erichson, 1837
Colymbetes fuscus (Linnaeus, 1758)
Rhantus grapii (Gyllenhal, 1808)
Rhantus exsoletus (Forster, 1771)
Rhantus frontalis (Marsham, 1802)
Rhantus suturalis (Macleay, 1825)
Rhantus suturellus (Harris, 1828)
Liopterus haemorrhoidalis (Fabricius, 1787)
Acilius canaliculatus (Nicolai, 1822)
Acilius sulcatus (Linnaeus, 1758)
Dytiscus circumcinctus Ahrens, 1811
Dytiscus circumflexus Fabricius, 1801
Dytiscus lapponicus Gyllenhal, 1808
Dytiscus marginalis Linnaeus, 1758
Dytiscus semisulcatus Müller, 1776
Hydaticus seminiger (DeGeer, 1774)
Bidessus minutissimus (Germar, 1824)
Graptodytes bilineatus (Sturm, 1835)
Graptodytes granularis (Linnaeus, 1767)
Graptodytes pictus (Fabricius, 1787)
Hydroporus angustatus Sturm, 1835
Hydroporus discretus Fairmaire & Brisout, 1859
Hydroporus erythrocephalus (Linnaeus, 1758)
Hydroporus glabriusculus (Aubé, 1838)
Hydroporus gyllenhalii Schiødte, 1841
Hydroporus incognitus Sharp, 1869
Hydroporus longicornis Sharp, 1871
Hydroporus longulus Mulsant & Rey, 1860
Hydroporus melanarius Sturm, 1835
Hydroporus memnonius Nicolai, 1822
Hydroporus morio Aubé, 1838
Hydroporus neglectus Schaum, 1845
Hydroporus nigrita (Fabricius, 1792)
Hydroporus obscurus Sturm, 1835
Hydroporus obsoletus Aubé, 1838
Hydroporus palustris (Linnaeus, 1761)
Hydroporus planus (Fabricius, 1782)
Hydroporus pubescens (Gyllenhal, 1808)
Hydroporus scalesianus Stephens, 1828
Hydroporus striola (Gyllenhal, 1826)
Hydroporus tessellatus Drapiez, 1819
Hydroporus tristis (Paykull, 1798)
Hydroporus umbrosus (Gyllenhal, 1808)
Nebrioporus assimilis (Paykull, 1798)
Nebrioporus depressus (Fabricius, 1775)
Nebrioporus elegans (Panzer, 1794)
Oreodytes davisii (Curtis, 1831)
Oreodytes sanmarkii (Sahlberg, 1826)
Oreodytes septentrionalis (Gyllenhal, 1826)
Porhydrus lineatus (Fabricius, 1775)
Stictonectes lepidus (Olivier, 1795)
Stictotarsus duodecimpustulatus (Fabricius, 1792)
Stictotarsus multilineatus (Falkenström, 1922)
Suphrodytes dorsalis (Fabricius, 1787)
Hydrovatus clypealis Sharp, 1876
Hygrotus confluens (Fabricius, 1787)
Hygrotus impressopunctatus (Schaller, 1783)
Hygrotus novemlineatus (Stephens, 1829)
Hygrotus decoratus Gyllenhal, 1810
Hygrotus inaequalis (Fabricius, 1777)
Hygrotus quinquelineatus (Zetterstedt, 1828)
Hygrotus versicolor (Schaller, 1783)
Hygrotus parallellogrammus (Ahrens, 1812)
Hyphydrus ovatus (Linnaeus, 1761)
Laccornis oblongus (Stephens, 1835)
Laccophilus hyalinus (DeGeer, 1774)
Laccophilus minutus (Linnaeus, 1758)

Family Noteridae (burrowing water beetles)

Noterus clavicornis (DeGeer, 1774)
Noterus crassicornis (Müller, O.F 1776)

Family Haliplidae (crawling water beetles) 

Brychius elevatus (Panzer, 1794)
Haliplus apicalis (Thomson, 1868)
Haliplus confinis (Stephens, 1828)
Haliplus flavicollis (Sturm, 1834)
Haliplus fluviatilis (Aubé, 1836)
Haliplus fulvus (Fabricius, 1801)
Haliplus immaculatus (Gerhardt, 1877)
Haliplus lineatocollis (Marsham, 1802)
Haliplus lineolatus (Mannerheim, 1844)
Haliplus obliquus (Fabricius, 1787)
Haliplus ruficollis (DeGeer, 1774)
Haliplus sibiricus Motschulsky, 1860
Haliplus variegatus Sturm, 1834

Family Gyrinidae (whirligig beetles)

Gyrinus aeratus (Stephens, 1835)
Gyrinus caspius Ménétriés, 1832
Gyrinus distinctus Aubé, 1838
Gyrinus marinus Gyllenhal, 1808
Gyrinus minutus Fabricius, 1798
Gyrinus natator (Linnaeus, 1758)
Gyrinus paykulli Ochs, 1927
Gyrinus substriatus Stephens, 1828
Gyrinus urinator Illiger, 1807
Orectochilus villosus (Müller, 1776)

Family Hygrobiidae (screech-beetles)
1 species
Hygrobia hermanni (Fabricius, 1775)

Suborder Polyphaga

Infraorder Bostrichiformia

Family Ptinidae (woodworm, woodborers, spider beetles)
18 species
Subfamily Anobiinae
Anobium punctatum (DeGeer, 1774)
Stegobium paniceum (Linnaeus, 1758)
Subfamily Dryophilinae
Dryophilus pusillus (Gyllenhal, 1808)
Grynobius planus (Fabricius, 1781)
Subfamily Ernobiinae
Ernobius mollis (Linnaeus, 1758)
Ochina ptinoides (Marsham, 1802)
Xestobium rufovillosum (DeGeer, 1774)
Subfamily Eucradinae
Ptinomorphus imperialis (Linnaeus, 1767)
Subfamily Ptilininae
Ptilinus pectinicornis (Linnaeus, 1758)
Subfamily Ptininae

Epauloecus unicolor (Piller & Mitterpacher, 1783)
Mezium affine Boieldieu, 1856
Niptus hololeucus (Faldermann, 1835)
Pseudeurostus hilleri (Reitter, 1877)
Ptinus clavipes Panzer, 1792
Ptinus fur (Linnaeus, 1758)
Ptinus subpilosus Sturm, 1837
Ptinus tectus Boieldieu, 1856
Trigonogenius globulus Solier, 1849
 
Subfamily Xyletininae
Lasioderma serricorne (Fabricius, 1792)

Family Bostrichidae (horned powderpost beetles, powderpost beetles, branch and twig borers)

Rhyzopertha dominica (Fabricius, 1792)
Lyctus brunneus (Stephens, 1830)
Lyctus linearis (Goeze, 1777)

Family Dermestidae (skin beetles)

Subfamily Attageninae
Reesa vespulae (Millirin, 1939)
Attagenus pellio (Linnaeus, 1758)
Attagenus unicolor (Brahm, 1791)
Subfamily Dermestinae
Dermestes ater DeGeer, 1774
Dermestes carnivorus Fabricius, 1775
Dermestes frischii Kugelann, 1792
Dermestes haemorrhoidalis Küster, 1852
Dermestes lardarius Linnaeus, 1758
Dermestes maculatus DeGeer, 1774
Dermestes murinus Linnaeus, 1758
Dermestes peruvianus Laporte de Castelnau, 1840
Subfamily Megatominae 
Anthrenus fuscus Olivier, 1789
Anthrenus verbasci (Linnaeus, 1767)
Trogoderma granarium Everts, 1898

Infraorder Cucujiformia

Family Alexiidae (minute bark beetles)
Sphaerosoma piliferum (Müller, 1821)

Family Anthicidae (ant-like flower beetles)

Anthicus angustatus Curtis, 1838
Anthicus constrictus Curtis, 1838
Anthicus flavipes (Panzer 1797)
Anthicus floralis (Linnaeus, 1758)

Family Anthribidae (fungus weevils)

Choragus sheppardi Kirby, 1819

Family Apionidae (seed weevils)

Subfamily Apioninae
Apion cruentatum Walton, 1844
Apion frumentarium (Linnaeus, 1758)
Apion miniatum Germar, 1833
Apion haematodes Kirby, 1808
Apion rubens Stephens, 1839
Apion onopordi Kirby, 1808
Apion carduorum Kirby, 1808
Apion gibbirostre Gyllenhal, 1813
Apion aeneum (Fabricius, 1775)
Apion radiolus (Marsham, 1802)
Apion seniculus Kirby, 1808
Apion gyllenhali Kirby, 1808
Apion confluens Kirby, 1808
Apion stolidum Germar, 1817
Apion ervi Kirby, 1808
Apion viciae (Paykull, 1800)
Apion vorax Herbst, 1797
Apion ulicis (Forster, 1771)
Apion aethiops Herbst, 1797
Apion pisi (Fabricius, 1801)
Apion loti Kirby, 1808
Apion modestum Germar, 1817
Apion virens Herbst, 1797
Apion cerdo Gerstäcker, 1854
Apion craccae (Linnaeus, 1767)
Apion subulatum Kirby, 1808
Apion affine Kirby, 1808
Apion curtirostre Germar, 1817
Apion hydrolapathi (Marsham, 1802)
Apion marchicum Herbst, 1797
Apion violaceum Kirby, 1808
Apion immune Kirby, 1808
Apion apricans Herbst, 1797
Apion assimile Kirby, 1808
Apion fulvipes (Geoffroy, 1785)
Apion nigritarse Kirby, 1808
Apion ononicola Bach, 1854
Apion trifolii (Linnaeus, 1768)
Apion atratulum Germar, 1817
Apion rufirostre (Fabricius, 1775)
Apion scutellare Kirby, 1811
Apion ebeninum Kirby, 1808
Subfamily Nanophyinae
Nanophyes marmoratus (Goeze, 1777)

Family Bothrideridae (dry bark beetles)
Anommatus duodecimstriatus (Müller, 1821)

Family Byturidae (fruitworms)

Byturus tomentosus (DeGeer, 1774)
Byturus ochraceus (Scriba, 1790)

Family Cerambycidae (longhorn beetles)

Aromia moschata (Linnaeus, 1758)
Callidium violaceum (Linnaeus, 1758)
Clytus arietis (Linnaeus, 1758)
Hylotrupes bajulus (Linnaeus, 1758)
Nathrius brevipennis (Mulsant, 1839)
Lamia textor (Linnaeus, 1758)
Leiopus nebulosus (Linnaeus, 1758)
Pogonocherus hispidulus (Piller & Mitterpacher, 1783)
Pogonocherus hispidus (Linnaeus, 1758)
Tetrops praeustus (Linnaeus, 1758)
Alosterna tabacicolor (DeGeer, 1775)
Grammoptera abdominalis (Stephens, 1831)
Grammoptera ruficornis (Fabricius, 1781)
Grammoptera ustulata Schaller, 1783
Leptura aurulenta Fabricius, 1792
Leptura quadrifasciata Linnaeus, 1758
Leptura quadrifasciata Linnaeus, 1758
Pseudovadonia livida (Fabricius, 1777)
Rhagium bifasciatum Fabricius, 1775
Rhagium mordax (DeGeer, 1775)
Rutpela maculata Poda, 1761
Stenurella melanura Linnaeus, 1758
Asemum striatum (Linnaeus, 1758)

Family Chrysomelidae (leaf beetles)

Bruchidius ater (Marsham, 1802)
Bruchus atomarius (Linnaeus, 1761)
Bruchus rufimanus Bohemann, 1833
Chrysolina banksi (Fabricius, 1775)
Chrysolina fastuosa (Scopoli, 1763)
Chrysolina hyperici (Forster, 1771)
Chrysolina oricalcia (Müller, 1776)
Chrysolina polita (Linnaeus, 1758)
Chrysolina sanguinolenta (Linnaeus, 1758)
Chrysolina staphylaea (Linnaeus, 1758)
Chrysolina varians (Schaller, 1783)
Gastrophysa polygoni (Linnaeus, 1758)
Gastrophysa viridula (DeGeer, 1775)
Gonioctena olivacea (Forster, 1771)
Gonioctena pallida (Linnaeus, 1758)
Hydrothassa marginella (Linnaeus, 1758)
Linaeida aenea Linnaeus, 1758
Phaedon armoraciae (Linnaeus, 1758)
Phaedon cochleariae (Fabricius, 1792)
Phaedon tumidulus (Germar, 1824)
Phratora laticollis (Suffrian, 1851)
Phratora vitellinae (Linnaeus, 1758)
Phratora vulgatissima (Linnaeus, 1758)
Plagiodera versicolora (Laicharting, 1781)
Prasocuris junci (Brahm, 1790)
Prasocuris phellandrii (Linnaeus, 1758)
Timarcha goettingensis (Linnaeus, 1758)
Timarcha tenebricosa (Fabricius, 1775)
Lema cyanella (Linnaeus, 1758)
Lilioceris lilii (Scopoli, 1763)
Oulema lichenis Voet, 1806
Oulema melanopus (Linnaeus, 1758)
Oulema septentrionis Weise, 1880
Clytra quadripunctata (Linnaeus, 1758)
Cryptocephalus aureolus Suffrian, 1847
Cryptocephalus labiatus (Linnaeus, 1761)
Cryptocephalus pusillus Fabricius, 1777
Donacia aquatica (Linnaeus, 1758)
Donacia bicolora Zschach, 1788
Donacia cinerea Herbst, 1784
Donacia clavipes Fabricius, 1792
Donacia crassipes Fabricius, 1775
Donacia dentata Hoppe, 1795
Donacia impressa Paykull, 1799
Donacia marginata Hoppe, 1795
Donacia obscura Gyllenhal, 1813
Donacia semicuprea Panzer, 1796
Donacia simplex Fabricius, 1775
Donacia thalassina Germar, 1811
Donacia versicolorea (Brahm, 1790)
Donacia vulgaris Zschach, 1788
Macroplea appendiculata (Panzer, 1794)
Plateumaris braccata (Scopoli, 1772)
Plateumaris discolor (Panzer, 1795)
Plateumaris rustica (Kunze, 1818)
Plateumaris sericea (Linnaeus, 1758)
Altica ericeti (Allard, 1869)
Altica lythri Aubé, 1843
Altica oleracea (Linnaeus, 1758)
Altica palustris Weise, 1888
Altica pusilla Duftschmid, 1825
Aphthona atrovirens Förster, 1849
Aphthona euphorbiae (Schrank, 1781)
Aphthona lutescens (Gyllenhal, 1813)
Aphthona melancholica Weise, 1888
Aphthona nonstriata (Goeze, 1777)
Apteropeda globosa (Illiger, 1794)
Apteropeda orbiculata (Marsham, 1802)
Apteropeda splendida Allard, 1860
Batophila rubi (Paykull, 1799)
Chaetocnema concinna (Marsham, 1802)
Chaetocnema hortensis (Geoffroy, 1785)
Chaetocnema sahlbergii (Gyllenhal, 1827)
Crepidodera aurata (Marsham, 1802)
Crepidodera aurea (Geoffroy, 1785)
Crepidodera fulvicornis (Fabricius, 1792)
Derocrepis rufipes (Linnaeus, 1758)
Galeruca tanaceti (Linnaeus, 1758)
Galerucella calmariensis (Linnaeus, 1767)
Galerucella grisescens (de Joannis, 1865)
Galerucella lineola (Fabricius, 1781)
Galerucella nymphaeae (Linnaeus, 1758)
Galerucella pusilla (Duftschmid, 1825)
Galerucella sagittariae (Gyllenhal, 1813)
Galerucella tenella (Linnaeus, 1761)
Hermaeophaga mercurialis (Fabricius, 1792)
Hippuriphila modeeri (Linnaeus, 1761)
Lochmaea caprea (Linnaeus, 1758)
Lochmaea crataegi (Forster, 1771)
Lochmaea suturalis (Thomson, 1866)
Longitarsus anchusae (Paykull, 1799)
Longitarsus atricillus (Linnaeus, 1761)
Longitarsus ballotae (Marsham, 1802)
Longitarsus brunneus (Duftschmid, 1825)
Longitarsus curtus (Allard, 1860)
Longitarsus exoletus (Linnaeus, 1758)
Longitarsus ferrugineus (Foudras, 1860)
Longitarsus ganglbaueri Heikertinger, 1912
Longitarsus gracilis Kutschera, 1864
Longitarsus holsaticus (Linnaeus, 1758)
Longitarsus jacobaeae (Waterhouse, 1858)
Longitarsus kutscherai (Rye, 1872)
Longitarsus luridus (Scopoli, 1763)
Longitarsus melanocephalus (DeGeer, 1775)
Longitarsus membranaceus (Foudras, 1860)
Longitarsus nigerrimus (Gyllenhal, 1827)
Longitarsus nigrofasciatus (Goeze, 1877)
Longitarsus ochroleucus (Marsham, 1802)
Longitarsus parvulus (Paykull, 1799)
Longitarsus pellucidus (Foudras, 1860)
Longitarsus pratensis (Panzer, 1794)
Longitarsus rubiginosus (Foudras, 1860)
Longitarsus succineus (Foudras, 1860)
Longitarsus suturalis (Marsham, 1802)
Longitarsus suturellus (Duftschmid, 1825)
Lythraria salicariae (Paykull, 1800)
Mantura chrysanthemi (Koch, 1803)
Mniophila muscorum (Koch, 1803)
Neocrepidodera ferruginea (Scopoli, 1763)
Neocrepidodera transversa (Marsham, 1802)
Ochrosis ventralis (Illiger, 1807)
Phyllobrotica quadrimaculata (Linnaeus, 1758)
Phyllotreta aerea Allard, 1859
Phyllotreta atra (Fabricius, 1775)
Phyllotreta consobrina (Curtis, 1837)
Phyllotreta exclamationis (Thunberg, 1784)
Phyllotreta flexuosa (Illiger, 1794)
Phyllotreta nemorum (Linnaeus, 1758)
Phyllotreta nigripes (Fabricius, 1775)
Phyllotreta nodicornis (Marsham, 1802)
Phyllotreta undulata Kutschera, 1860
Phyllotreta vittula (Redtenbacher, 1849)
Podagrica fuscipes (Fabricius, 1775)
Psylliodes affinis (Paykull, 1799)
Psylliodes attenuata (Koch, 1803)
Psylliodes chrysocephala (Linnaeus, 1758)
Psylliodes cuprea (Koch, 1803)
Psylliodes dulcamarae (Koch, 1803)
Psylliodes marcida (Illiger, 1807)
Psylliodes napi (Fabricius, 1792)
Psylliodes picina (Marsham, 1802)
Pyrrhalta viburni (Paykull, 1799)
Sermylassa halensis (Linnaeus, 1767)
Sphaeroderma rubidum (Graëlls, 1858)
Sphaeroderma testaceum (Fabricius, 1775)
Cassida flaveola Thunberg, 1794
Cassida hemisphaerica Herbst, 1799
Cassida nobilis Linnaeus, 1758
Cassida prasina Illiger, 1798
Cassida rubiginosa Müller, 1776
Cassida sanguinosa Suffrian, 1844
Cassida vibex Linnaeus, 1767
Cassida viridis Linnaeus, 1758
Oomorphus concolor (Sturm, 1807)

Family Cleridae (chequered beetles) 

Thanasimus formicarius (Linnaeus, 1758)
Necrobia ruficollis (Fabricius, 1775)
Necrobia rufipes (DeGeer, 1775)
Necrobia violacea (Linnaeus, 1758)
Tillus elongatus (Linnaeus, 1758)

Family Colydiidae (cylindrical bark beetles)
Pycnomerus depressiusculus (White, 1846)
Pycnomerus fuliginosus Erichson, 1842

Family Corylophidae (minute fungus beetles)

Corylophus cassidoides (Marsham, 1802)
Corylophus sublaevipennis Jacquelin du Val, 1859
Orthoperus atomus (Gyllenhal, 1808)
Orthoperus nigrescens Stephens, 1829
Sericoderus lateralis (Gyllenhal, 1827)

Family Endomychidae (handsome fungus beetles) 
Endomychus coccineus (Linnaeus, 1758)
Mycetaea subterranea (Fabricius, 1801)

Family Phloiophilidae 
Phloiophilus edwardsi (Stephens, 1830)

Family Trogossitidae 
Tenebroides mauritanicus (Linnaeus, 1758)
Thymalus limbatus (Fabricius, 1787)

Family Ciidae (minute tree-fungus beetles)

Cis bidentatus (Olivier, 1790)
Cis boleti (Scopoli, 1763)
Cis fagi Waltl, 1839
Cis hispidus (Paykull, 1798)
Cis nitidus (Fabricius, 1792)
Cis setiger Mellié, 1848
Ennearthron cornutum (Gyllenhal, 1827)
Octotemnus glabriculus (Gyllenhal, 1827)
Orthocis alni (Gyllenhal, 1813)
Orthocis festivus (Panzer, 1793)
Orthocis vestitus Mellié, 1848

Family Coccinellidae (ladybirds)

Chilocorus bipustulatus (Linnaeus, 1758)
Coccidula rufa (Herbst, 1783)
Rhyzobius litura (Fabricius, 1787)
Adalia bipunctata (Linnaeus, 1758)
Adalia decempunctata (Linnaeus, 1758)
Henosepilachna argus (Geoffory in Fourcroy, 1762) 
Anatis ocellata (Linnaeus, 1758)
Anisosticta novemdecimpunctata (Linnaeus, 1758)
Aphidecta obliterata (Linnaeus, 1758)
Calvia quatuordecimguttata (Linnaeus, 1758)
Coccinella hieroglyphica Linnaeus, 1758
Coccinella septempunctata Linnaeus, 1758
Coccinella undecimpunctata Linnaeus, 1758
Halyzia sedecimguttata (Linnaeus, 1758)
Hippodamia tredecimpunctata (Linnaeus, 1758)
Myrrha octodecimguttata (Linnaeus, 1758)
Myzia oblongoguttata (Linnaeus, 1758)
Propylea quatuordecimpunctata (Linnaeus, 1758)
Psyllobora vigintiduopunctata (Linnaeus, 1758)
Tytthaspis sedecimpunctata (Linnaeus, 1761)
Subcoccinella vigintiquatuorpunctata (Linnaeus, 1758)
Hyperaspis pseudopustulata Mulsant, 1853
Nephus redtenbacheri (Mulsant, 1846)
Scymnus auritus Thunberg, 1795
Scymnus limbatus Stephens, 1832
Scymnus suturalis Thunberg, 1795
Scymnus nigrinus Kugelann, 1794
Scymnus schmidti Fürsch, 1967

Family Cryptophagidae (silken fungus beetles)

Subfamily Atomariinae
Atomaria lewisi Reitter, 1877
Atomaria procerula Erichson, 1846
Atomaria atricapilla Stephens, 1830
Atomaria apicalis Erichson, 1846
Atomaria basalis Erichson, 1846
Atomaria clavigera Ganglbauer, 1899
Atomaria fuscata (Schönherr, 1808)
Atomaria fuscipes (Gyllenhal, 1808)
Atomaria gutta Newman, 1834
Atomaria mesomela (Herbst, 1792)
Atomaria munda Erichson, 1846
Atomaria nitidula (Marsham, 1802)
Atomaria peltata Kraatz, 1853
Atomaria pusilla (Paykull, 1798)
Atomaria rubella Heer, 1841
Atomaria rubricollis Brisout, 1863
Atomaria testacea Stephens, 1830
Atomaria zetterstedti (Zetterstedt, 1838)
Atomaria turgida Erichson, 1846
Atomaria barani Brisout, 1863
Atomaria fimetarii (Fabricius, 1792)
Atomaria linearis Stephens, 1830
Atomaria nigrirostris Stephens, 1830
Atomaria nigriventris Stephens, 1830
Atomaria strandi Johnson, 1967
Atomaria umbrina (Gyllenhal, 1827)
Atomaria wollastoni Sharp, 1867
Ephistemus globulus (Paykull, 1798)
Ootypus globosus (Waltl, 1838)
Subfamily Cryptophaginae
Antherophagus canescens Grouvelle, 1916
Antherophagus nigricornis (Fabricius, 1787)
Antherophagus pallens (Linnaeus, 1758)
Caenoscelis ferruginea (Sahlberg, 1820)
Cryptophagus acutangulus (Gyllenhal, 1827)
Cryptophagus cellaris (Scopoli, 1763)
Cryptophagus dentatus (Herbst, 1793)
Cryptophagus distinguendus Sturm, 1845
Cryptophagus laticollis Lucas, 1846
Cryptophagus lycoperdi (Scopoli, 1763)
Cryptophagus pallidus Sturm, 1845
Cryptophagus pilosus Gyllenhal, 1827
Cryptophagus pseudodentatus Bruce, 1934
Cryptophagus pubescens Sturm, 1845
Cryptophagus ruficornis Stephens, 1830
Cryptophagus saginatus Sturm, 1845
Cryptophagus scanicus (Linnaeus, 1758)
Cryptophagus schmidti Sturm, 1845
Cryptophagus scutellatus Newman, 1834
Cryptophagus setulosus Sturm, 1845
Cryptophagus subfumatus Kraatz, 1856
Henoticus californicus (Mannerheim, 1843)
Henoticus serratus (Gyllenhal, 1808)
Micrambe bimaculata (Panzer, 1798)
Micrambe villosa (Heer, 1841)
Micrambe vini (Panzer, 1797)
Paramecosoma melanocephalum (Herbst, 1793)
Telmatophilus caricis (Olivier, 1790)
Telmatophilus schoenherrii (Gyllenhal, 1808)
Telmatophilus typhae (Fallén, 1802)

Family Curculionidae (true weevils)

Subfamily Baridinae

Parathelcus pollinarius (Forster, 1771)
 
Subfamily Entiminae 

Alophus triguttatus (Fabricius, 1792)
Attacta plumbeus (Marsham, 1802)
Barynotus moerens (Fabricius, 1792)
Barynotus obscurus (Fabricius, 1775)
Barynotus squamosus Germar, 1824
Barypeithes araneiformis (Schrank, 1781)
Barypeithes curvimanus (Jacquelin du Val, 1855)
Barypeithes pellucidus (Boheman, 1834)
Barypeithes pyrenaeus Seidlitz, 1868
Barypeithes sulcifrons (Boheman, 1843)
Brachysomus echinatus (Bonsdorff, 1785)
Caenopsis fissirostris (Walton, 1847)
Caenopsis waltoni (Boheman, 1843)
Liophloeus tessulatus (Müller, 1776)
Neliocarus nebulosus Stephens, 1831
Neliocarus sus Stephens, 1831
Otiorhynchus arcticus (Fabricius, 1780)
Otiorhynchus atroapterus (DeGeer, 1775)
Otiorhynchus auropunctatus Gyllenhal, 1834
Otiorhynchus clavipes (Bonsdorff, 1785)
Otiorhynchus desertus Rosenhauer, 1847
Otiorhynchus ligneus (Olivier, 1807)
Otiorhynchus nodosus (Müller, 1764)
Otiorhynchus ovatus (Linnaeus, 1758)
Otiorhynchus porcatus (Herbst, 1795)
Otiorhynchus rugifrons (Gyllenhal, 1813)
Otiorhynchus rugostriatus (Goeze, 1777)
Otiorhynchus singularis (Linnaeus, 1767)
Otiorhynchus sulcatus (Fabricius, 1775)
Otiorhynchus uncinatus Germar, 1824
Philopedon plagiatus (Schaller, 1783)
Phyllobius argentatus (Linnaeus, 1758)
Phyllobius glaucus (Scopoli 1763)
Phyllobius maculicornis Germar, 1824
Phyllobius oblongus (Linnaeus, 1758)
Phyllobius pomaceus Gyllenhal, 1834
Phyllobius pyri (Linnaeus, 1758)
Phyllobius roboretanus Gredler, 1882
Phyllobius virideaeris (Laicharting 1781)
Polydrusus cervinus (Linnaeus, 1758)
Polydrusus mollis (Ström, 1768)
Polydrusus pilosus Gredler, 1866
Polydrusus pterygomalis Boheman, 1840
Polydrusus pulchellus Stephens, 1831
Polydrusus tereticollis (DeGeer 1775)
Polydrusus tereticollis (De Geer 1775)
Polydrusus formosus (Mayer, 1779)
Sciaphilus asperatus (Bonsdorff, 1785)
Sitona ambiguus Gyllenhal, 1834
Sitona cylindricollis Fåhraeus 1840
Sitona griseus (Fabricius, 1775)
Sitona hispidulus (Fabricius, 1777)
Sitona lepidus Gyllenhal, 1834
Sitona lineatus (Linnaeus, 1758)
Sitona lineellus (Bonsdorff, 1785)
Sitona macularius (Marsham 1802)
Sitona ononidis Sharp, 1866
Sitona puberulus Reitter, 1903
Sitona puncticollis Stephens, 1831
Sitona regensteinensis (Herbst, 1797)
Sitona striatellus Gyllenhal, 1834
Sitona sulcifrons (Thunberg, 1798)
Sitona suturalis Stephens, 1831
Sitona waterhousei Walton, 1846
Strophosoma capitatum (DeGeer, 1775)
Strophosoma melanogrammum (Forster, 1771)
Trachyphloeus angustisetulus Hansen, 1915
Trachyphloeus asperatus Boheman 1843
Trachyphloeus scabriculus (Linnaeus, 1771)
Tropiphorus obtusus (Bonsdorff, 1785)
Tropiphorus terricola (Newman, 1838)
Subfamily Hyperinae 
Hypera arator (Linnaeus, 1758)
Hypera dauci (Olivier, 1807)
Hypera fuscocinerea (Marsham, 1802)
Hypera nigrirostris (Fabricius, 1775)
Hypera plantaginis (DeGeer, 1775)
Hypera pollux (Fabricius 1801)
Hypera postica (Gyllenhal, 1813)
Hypera rumicis (Linnaeus, 1758)
Hypera suspiciosa (Herbst, 1795)
Hypera venusta (Fabricius, 1781)
Hypera zoilus (Scopoli, 1763)

Subfamily Cossoninae

Euophryum confine (Broun, 1881)
Euophryum rufum (Broun, 1880)
Pentarthrum huttoni Wollaston, 1854
Pselactus spadix (Herbst, 1795)
Pseudophloeophagus aeneopiceus Boheman, 1845
Rhopalomesites tardyi (Curtis, 1825)
 
Subfamily Curculioninae

Acalles misellus Boheman, 1844
Acalles ptinoides (Marsham, 1802)
Acalles roboris Curtis, 1835
Anoplus plantaris (Naezen, 1794)
Anoplus roboris Suffrian, 1840
Anthonomus bituberculatus Thomson, 1868
Anthonomus brunnipennis Curtis, 1840
Anthonomus pedicularius (Linnaeus, 1758)
Anthonomus pomorum (Linnaeus, 1758)
Anthonomus rubi (Herbst, 1795)
Anthonomus rufus Gyllenhal, 1836
Anthonomus ulmi (DeGeer, 1775)
Archarius pyrrhoceras Marsham, 1802
Archarius salicivorus Paykull, 1792
Bagous brevis Gyllenhal, 1836
Bagous collignensis (Herbst, 1797)
Bagous glabrirostris (Herbst, 1795)
Bagous limosus (Gyllenhal, 1827)
Bagous lutulentus (Gyllenhal, 1813)
Bagous alismatis (Marsham, 1802)
Calosirus terminatus (Herbst, 1795)
Ceutorhynchus cakilis (Hansen, 1917)
Ceutorhynchus chalybaeus Germar, 1824
Ceutorhynchus cochleariae (Gyllenhal, 1813)
Ceutorhynchus erysimi (Fabricius, 1787)
Ceutorhynchus hirtulus Germar, 1824
Ceutorhynchus minutus (Reich 1797)
Ceutorhynchus obstrictus (Marsham, 1802)
Ceutorhynchus pallidactylus (Marsham, 1802)
Ceutorhynchus pyrrhorhynchus (Marsham, 1802)
Ceutorhynchus typhae (Herbst 1795)
Ceutorhynchus unguicularis Thomson, C.G 1871
Cionus alauda (Herbst, 1784)
Cionus hortulanus (Geoffroy, 1785)
Cionus scrophulariae (Linnaeus 1758)
Cleonis pigra (Scopoli, 1763)
Cleopus pulchellus (Herbst, 1795)
Coeliodes rana (Fabricius 1787)
Coeliodes ruber (Marsham, 1802)
Coeliodes transversealbofasciatus (Goeze 1777)
Cryptorhynchus lapathi (Linnaeus, 1758)
Curculio betulae (Stephens, 1831)
Dorytomus hirtipennis Bedel 1884
Dorytomus melanophthalmus (Paykull, 1792)
Dorytomus rufatus (Bedel, 1888)
Dorytomus taeniatus (Fabricius, 1781)
Dorytomus tortrix (Linnaeus, 1761)
Ellescus bipunctatus (Linnaeus, 1758)
Eubrychius velutus (Beck, 1817)
Glocianus distinctus Brisout, 1870
Glocianus punctiger (Sahlberg, 1835)
Gymnetron antirrhini (Paykull, 1800)
Gymnetron beccabungae (Linnaeus, 1761)
Gymnetron labile (Herbst, 1795)
Gymnetron pascuorum (Gyllenhal, 1813)
Gymnetron villosulum Gyllenhal, 1838
Hylobius abietis (Linnaeus, 1758)
Leiosoma deflexum (Panzer, 1795)
Leiosoma oblongulum Boheman, 1842
Leiosoma troglodytes (Rye, 1873)
Limnobaris dolorosa (Goeze, 1777)
Magdalis armigera (Geoffroy, 1785)
Magdalis carbonaria (Linnaeus, 1758)
Mecinus collaris Germar, 1821
Mecinus pyraster (Herbst, 1795)
Miarus campanulae (Linnaeus, 1767)
Micrelus ericae (Gyllenhal, 1813)
Nedyus quadrimaculatus (Linnaeus, 1758)
Orchestes alni (Linnaeus, 1758)
Orchestes calceatus (Germar, 1821)
Orchestes fagi (Linnaeus, 1758)
Orchestes foliorum (Müller, 1764)
Orchestes pilosus (Fabricius, 1781)
Orchestes quercus (Linnaeus, 1758)
Orchestes rusci (Herbst, 1795)
Orchestes testaceus (Müller, 1776)
Orobitis cyaneus (Linnaeus, 1758)
Orthochaetes insignis (Aubé, 1863)
Orthochaetes setiger (Beck, 1817)
Pelenomus canaliculatus (Fåhraeus, 1843)
Pelenomus comari (Herbst, 1795)
Pelenomus quadrituberculatus (Fabricius, 1787)
Phytobius leucogaster (Marsham, 1802)
Pissodes castaneus (DeGeer, 1775)
Pissodes pini (Linnaeus, 1758)
Poophagus sisymbrii (Fabricius, 1777)
Rhamphus oxyacanthae (Marsham, 1802)
Rhamphus pulicarius (Herbst, 1795)
Rhinoncus castor (Fabricius, 1792)
Rhinoncus inconspectus (Herbst, 1795)
Rhinoncus pericarpius (Linnaeus, 1758)
Rhinoncus perpendicularis (Reich, 1797)
Sirocalodes mixtus (Mulsant & Rey, 1858)
Stenocarus ruficornis (Stephens, 1831)
Syagrius intrudens Waterhouse, 1903
Tachyerges salicis (Linnaeus, 1758)
Tachyerges stigma (Germar, 1821)
Tanysphyrus lemnae (Paykull, 1792)
Thamiocolus viduatus (Gyllenhal, 1813)
Trichosirocalus dawsoni (Brisout, 1869)
Trichosirocalus troglodytes (Fabricius, 1787)
Tychius junceus (Reich, 1797)
Tychius picirostris (Fabricius, 1787)
Tychius squamulatus Gyllenhal, 1836
Tychius stephensi Gyllenhal, 1836
Tychius tibialis Boheman, 1843

Subfamily Molytinae

Liparus coronatus (Goeze 1777)

Subfamily Scolytinae

Dryocoetes autographus (Ratzeburg, 1837)
Dryocoetes villosus (Fabricius 1792)
Hylastes brunneus Erichson, 1836
Hylastes cunicularius Erichson, 1836
Hylastes opacus Erichson, 1836
Hylastinus obscurus (Marsham, 1802)
Hylesinus crenatus (Fabricius, 1787)
Hylesinus fraxini (Panzer 1779)
Hylurgops palliatus (Gyllenhal, 1813)
Orthotomicus laricis (Fabricius, 1792)
Phloeotribus rhododactylus (Marsham, 1802)
Pityogenes bidentatus (Herbst, 1783)
Pityophthorus pubescens (Marsham, 1802)
Pteleobius vittatus Fabricius, 1787
Scolytus multistriatus (Marsham, 1802)
Scolytus scolytus (Fabricius, 1775)
Tomicus piniperda (Linnaeus, 1758)
Trypodendron domesticum (Linnaeus, 1758)
Trypophloeus asperatus (Gyllenhal, 1813)

Family Attelabidae (leaf-rolling weevils)
Apoderus coryli (Linnaeus, 1758)

Family Erirhinidae (wetland weevils) 

Grypus equiseti (Fabricius, 1775)
Notaris acridulus (Linnaeus, 1758)
Notaris aethiops (Fabricius, 1792)
Notaris scirpi (Fabricius, 1792)
Thryogenes festucae (Herbst, 1795)
Thryogenes nereis (Paykull, 1800)
Tournotaris bimaculatus (Fabricius, 1787)

Family Dryophthoridae (palm weevils) 
Sitophilus granarius (Linnaeus, 1758)
Sitophilus zeamais (Motschulsky), 1855 
Sitophilus oryzae (Linnaeus, 1763)

Family Cerylonidae

Cerylon fagi Brisout, 1867
Cerylon ferrugineum Stephens, 1830
Cerylon histeroides (Fabricius, 1792)

Family Erotylidae (pleasing fungus beetles)
Dacne bipustulata (Thunberg, 1781)

Family Kateretidae (short-winged flower beetles)
Brachypterus glaber (Stephens, 1835)
Brachypterus urticae (Fabricius, 1792)
Kateretes pedicularius (Linnaeus, 1758)
Kateretes pusillus Thunberg, 1794
Kateretes rufilabris (Latreille, 1807)

Family Laemophloeidae (lined flat bark beetles) 

Cryptolestes ferrugineus (Stephens, 1831)
Cryptolestes pusillus (Schönherr, 1817)

Family Latridiidae (minute brown scavenger beetles)

Subfamily Corticariinae
Corticaria crenulata (Gyllenhal, 1827)
Corticaria elongata (Gyllenhal, 1827)
Corticaria ferruginea Marsham, 1802
Corticaria fulva (Comolli, 1837)
Corticaria impressa (Olivier, 1790)
Corticaria inconspicua Wollaston, 1860
Corticaria punctulata (Marsham, 1802)
Corticaria serrata (Paykull, 1798)
Corticaria umbilicata (Beck, 1817)
Corticarina fuscula (Gyllenhal, 1827)
Corticarina similata (Gyllenhal, 1827)
Cortinicara gibbosa (Herbst, 1793)
Melanophthalma transversalis auctt.
Subfamily Latridiinae
Adistemia watsoni (Wollaston, 1871)
Cartodere bifasciatus (Reitter, 1877)
Cartodere nodifer (Westwood, 1839)
Dienerella filiformis (Gyllenhal, 1827)
Dienerella filum (Aubé, 1850)
Dienerella ruficollis (Marsham, 1802)
Enicmus histrio Joy & Tomlin, 1910
Enicmus testaceus (Stephens, 1830)
Enicmus transversus (Olivier, 1790)
Latridius anthracinus Mannerheim, 1844
Latridius minutus (Linnaeus, 1767)
Latridius pseudominutus (Strand, 1958)
Stephostethus lardarius (DeGeer, 1775)
Thes bergrothi (Reitter, 1880)

Family Lymexylidae (ship-timber beetles) 
Hylecoetus dermestoides (Linnaeus, 1761)

Family Malachiidae (soft-winged flower beetles) 

Anthocomus fasciatus

Family Melandryidae (false darkling beetles)

Subfamily Hallomeninae
Hallomenus binotatus (Quensel, 1790)
Subfamily Melandryinae
Abdera flexuosa (Paykull, 1799)
Melandrya caraboides (Linnaeus, 1761)
Orchesia micans (Panzer, 1791)
Orchesia minor Walker, 1837
Orchesia undulata Kraatz, 1853
Subfamily Osphyinae
Conopalpus testaceus (Olivier, 1790)

Family Mycetophagidae (hairy fungus beetles)
Litargus connexus (Geoffroy, 1785)
Typhaea stercorea (Linnaeus, 1758)

Family Pyrochroidae (fire-coloured beetles)
Pyrochroa serraticornis (Scopoli, 1763)

Family Salpingidae (narrow-waisted bark beetles)

Subfamily Agleninae
Aglenus brunneus (Gyllenhal, 1813)
Subfamily Salpinginae
Lissodema denticolle (Gyllenhal, 1813)
Lissodema quadripustulata (Marsham, 1802)nec (Fabricius, 1775)
Rabocerus foveolatus (Ljungh, 1823)
Rabocerus gabrieli (Gerhardt, 1901)
Salpingus planirostris (Fabricius, 1787)
Salpingus ruficollis (Linnaeus, 1761)
Sphaeriestes ater (Paykull, 1798)
Sphaeriestes castaneus (Panzer, 1796)
Sphaeriestes reyi (Abeille de Perrin, 1874)
Vincenzellus ruficollis (Panzer, 1794)

Family Tetratomidae (polypore fungus beetles)
Tetratoma ancora Fabricius, 1790
Tetratoma fungorum Fabricius, 1790

Family Tenebrionidae (darkling beetles)

Subfamily Alleculinae
Gonodera luperus (Herbst, 1783)
Subfamily Diaperinae
Crypticus quisquilius (Linnaeus, 1761)
Gnatocerus cornutus (Fabricius, 1798)
Phaleria cadaverina (Fabricius, 1792)
Subfamily Lagriinae
Lagria hirta (Linnaeus, 1758)
Subfamily Tenebrioninae
Alphitobius diaperinus (Panzer, 1797)
Blaps lethifera Marsham, 1802
Blaps mucronata Latreille, 1804
Melanimon tibialis (Fabricius, 1781)
Nalassus laevioctostriatus (Goeze, 1777)
Opatrum sabulosum (Linnaeus, 1761)
Palorus ratzeburgi (Wissmann, 1848)
Palorus subdepressus (Wollaston, 1864)
Phylan gibbus (Fabricius, 1775)
Tenebrio molitor Linnaeus, 1758
Tenebrio obscurus Fabricius, 1792
Tribolium castaneum (Herbst, 1797)
Tribolium confusum Jacquelin du Val, 1863
Xanthomus pallidus (Curtis, 1830)

Family Meloidae (blister beetles)
Lytta vesicatoria (Linnaeus, 1758)
Meloe proscarabaeus Linnaeus, 1758
Meloe violaceus Marsham, 1802

Family Melyridae (soft-wing flower beetles)

Subfamily Dasytinae
Dasytes aeratus (Stephens, 1830)
Psilothrix viridicoeruleus (Geoffroy, 1785)
Subfamily Malachiinae
Anthocomus fasciatus (Linnaeus, 1758)
Malachius bipustulatus (Linnaeus, 1758)

Family Mordellidae (tumbling flower beetles)
Mordellistena neuwaldeggiana (Panzer, 1796)

Family Monotomidae (root-eating beetles)

Monotoma angusticollis (Stephens, 1835)
Monotoma angusticollis (Gyllenhal, 1827)
Monotoma bicolor Villa, 1835
Monotoma conicicollis Aubé, 1837
Monotoma longicollis (Gyllenhal, 1827)
Monotoma picipes Herbst, 1793
Monotoma spinicollis Aubé, 1837
Monotoma quadricollis Aubé, 1837
Rhizophagus cribratus Gyllenhal, 1827
Rhizophagus depressus (Fabricius, 1792)
Rhizophagus dispar (Paykull, 1800)
Rhizophagus ferrugineus (Paykull, 1800)
Rhizophagus parallelocollis Gyllenhal, 1827
Rhizophagus perforatus Erichson, 1845

Family Nitidulidae (sap beetles) 

Subfamily Carpophilinae
Carpophilus hemipterus (Linnaeus, 1758)
Epuraea adumbrata Mannerheim, 1852
Epuraea aestiva (Linnaeus, 1758)
Epuraea angustula Sturm, 1844
Epuraea deleta Erichson, 1843
Epuraea longula Erichson, 1845
Epuraea marseuli Reitter, 1872
Epuraea melanocephala (Marsham, 1802)
Epuraea melina Erichson, 1843
Epuraea pallescens (Stephens, 1832)
Epuraea rufomarginata (Stephens, 1830)
Epuraea silacea (Herbst, 1784)
Epuraea thoracica Tournier, 1872
Epuraea unicolor (Olivier, 1790)
Subfamily Cryptarchinae
Glischrochilus hortensis (Geoffroy, 1785)
Glischrochilus quadriguttatus (Fabricius, 1776)
Glischrochilus quadripunctatus (Linnaeus, 1758)
Pityophagus ferrugineus (Linnaeus, 1761)
Subfamily Meligethinae
Laria dulcamarae Scopoli, 1763
Meligethes aeneus (Fabricius, 1775)
Meligethes atratus (Olivier, 1790)
Meligethes bidens Brisout, 1863
Meligethes brunnicornis Sturm, 1845
Meligethes carinulatus Förster, 1849
Meligethes difficilis (Heer, 1841)
Meligethes exilis Sturm, 1845
Meligethes flavimanus Stephens, 1830
Meligethes nigrescens Stephens, 1830
Meligethes obscurus Erichson, 1845
Meligethes ovatus Sturm, 1845
Meligethes pedicularius (Gyllenhal, 1808)
Meligethes persicus Faldermann, 1837
Meligethes ruficornis (Marsham, 1802)
Meligethes viridescens (Fabricius, 1787)
Subfamily Nitidulinae
Cychramus luteus (Fabricius, 1787)
Nitidula bipunctata (Linnaeus, 1758)
Omosita colon (Linnaeus, 1758)
Omosita depressa (Linnaeus, 1758)
Omosita discoidea (Fabricius, 1775)
Pocadius ferrugineus (Fabricius, 1775)
Soronia grisea (Linnaeus, 1758)
Soronia punctatissima (Illiger, 1794)

Family Oedemeridae (pollen-feeding beetles)
Ischnomera sanguinicollis (Fabricius, 1787)
Nacerdes melanura (Linnaeus, 1758)
Oedemera lurida (Marsham, 1802)

Family Phalacridae (shining flower beetles)

Olibrus aeneus (Fabricius, 1792)
Olibrus aeneus (Fabricius, 1792)
Olibrus liquidus Erichson, 1845
Phalacrus caricis Sturm, 1807
Phalacrus corruscus (Panzer, 1797)
Phalacrus substriatus Gyllenhal, 1813

Family Rhynchitidae (tooth-nosed snout weevils)

Deporaus betulae (Linnaeus, 1758)
Neocoenorrhinus aeneovirens (Marsham, 1802)
Neocoenorrhinus germanicus (Herbst, 1797)
Rhynchites olivaceus (Gyllenhal, 1833)
Temnocerus tomentosus (Gyllenhal, 1839)

Family Ripiphoridae (wedge-shaped beetles)
Metoecus paradoxus (Linnaeus, 1761)

Family Scraptiidae (false flower beetles)

Anaspis fasciata (Forster, 1771)
Anaspis frontalis (Linnaeus, 1758)
Anaspis garneysi Fowler, 1889
Anaspis lurida Stephens, 1832
Anaspis maculata Geoffroy, 1785
Anaspis regimbarti Schilsky, 1895
Anaspis rufilabris (Gyllenhal, 1827)
Anaspis thoracica (Linnaeus, 1758)

Family Sphindidae (dry-fungus beetles)

Aspidiphorus orbiculatus (Gyllenhal, 1808)

Family Silvanidae (silvan flat bark beetles)
Rhyzopertha dominica (Fabricius, 1792)
Oryzaephilus surinamensis (Linnaeus, 1758)

Infraorder Elateriformia

Family Dascillidae

Dascillus cervinus (Linnaeus, 1758)

Family Byrrhidae (pill beetles)

Byrrhus arietinus Steffahny, 1842
Byrrhus fasciatus (Forster, 1771)
Byrrhus pilula (Linnaeus, 1758)
Byrrhus pustulatus (Forster, 1771)
Cytilus sericeus (Forster, 1771)
Morychus aeneus (Fabricius, 1775)
Simplocaria semistriata (Fabricius, 1794)

Family Dryopidae (long-toed water beetles)

Dryops ernesti Des Gozis, 1886
Dryops luridus (Erichson, 1847)
Dryops similaris Bollow, 1936

Family Elmidae (riffle beetles)

Elmis aenea (Müller, 1806)
Esolus parallelepipedus (Müller, 1806)
Limnius volckmari (Panzer, 1793)
Oulimnius tuberculatus (Müller, 1806)

Family Heteroceridae (variegated mud-loving beetles)

Augyles maritimus (Guérin-Méneville, 1844)
Heterocerus fenestratus (Thunberg, 1784)
Heterocerus flexuosus Stephens, 1828
Heterocerus fossor Kiesenwetter, 1843
Heterocerus marginatus (Fabricius, 1787)

Family Elateridae (click beetles)

Agrypnus murinus (Linnaeus, 1758)
Actenicerus sjaelandicus (Müller, 1764)
Aplotarsus incanus (Gyllenhal, 1827)
Athous campyloides Newman, 1833
Athous haemorrhoidalis (Fabricius, 1801)
Athous subfuscus (Müller, O.F 1764)
Calambus bipustulatus (Linnaeus, 1767)
Ctenicera cuprea (Fabricius, 1775)
Denticollis linearis (Linnaeus, 1758)
Hemicrepidius hirtus (Herbst, 1784)
Prosternon tessellatum (Linnaeus, 1758)
Selatosomus aeneus (Linnaeus, 1758)
Selatosomus melancholicus (Fabricius, 1798)
Adrastus pallens (Fabricius, 1792)
Agriotes lineatus (Linnaeus, 1767)
Agriotes obscurus (Linnaeus, 1758)
Agriotes pallidulus (Illiger, 1807)
Ampedus balteatus (Linnaeus, 1758)
Ampedus pomonae (Stephens, 1830)
Ampedus pomorum (Herbst, 1784)
Dalopius marginatus (Linnaeus, 1758)
Melanotus villosus (Geoffroy, 1785)
Sericus brunneus (Linnaeus, 1758)
Hypnoidus riparius (Fabricius, 1792)
Zorochros minimus (Lacordaire, 1835)

Family Cantharidae (soldier beetles / leatherwings)

Cantharis cryptica (Ashe, 1947)
Cantharis figurata Mannerheim, 1843
Cantharis lateralis Linnaeus, 1758
Cantharis nigra (DeGeer, 1774)
Cantharis nigricans (Müller, O.F 1776)
Cantharis pallida Goeze, 1777
Cantharis paludosa Fallén, 1807
Cantharis pellucida Fabricius, 1792
Cantharis rufa Linnaeus, 1758
Cantharis thoracica (Olivier, 1790)
Crudosilis ruficollis (Fabricius, 1775)
Podabrus alpinus (Paykull, 1798)
Rhagonycha femoralis (Brullé, 1832)
Rhagonycha fulva (Scopoli, 1763)
Rhagonycha lignosa (Müller, 1764)
Rhagonycha lutea (Müller, 1764)
Rhagonycha translucida (Krynicki, 1832)
Malthinus balteatus Suffrian, 1851
Malthinus punctatus (Geoffroy, 1785)
Malthinus seriepunctatus Kiesenwetter, 1852
Malthodes dispar (Germar, 1824)
Malthodes flavoguttatus Kiesenwetter, 1852
Malthodes fuscus (Waltl, 1838)
Malthodes guttifer Kiesenwetter, 1852
Malthodes marginatus (Latreille, 1806)
Malthodes minimus (Linnaeus, 1758)
Malthodes pumilus (Brébisson, 1835)

Family Eucnemidae (false click beetles)
Melasis bupestroides (Linnaeus, 1761)

Family Lycidae
Pyropterus nigroruber (DeGeer, 1774)

Throscidae (false metallic wood-boring beetles)
Trixagus dermestoides (Linnaeus, 1767)

Family Clambidae (minute beetle or fringe-winged beetles)

Calyptomerus dubius (Marsham, 1802)
Clambus armadillo (DeGeer, 1774)
Clambus evae Endrödi-Younga, 1960
Clambus pallidulus Reitter, 1911
Clambus pubescens Redtenbacher, 1849
Clambus punctulus (Beck, 1817)

Family Scirtidae (marsh beetles)

Cyphon coarctatus Paykull, 1799
Cyphon hilaris Nyholm, 1944
Cyphon kongsbergensis Munster, 1924
Cyphon laevipennis Tournier, 1868
Cyphon ochraceus Stephens, 1830
Cyphon padi (Linnaeus, 1758)
Cyphon palustris Thomson, C.G 1855
Cyphon pubescens (Fabricius, 1792)
Cyphon punctipennis Sharp, 1873
Cyphon variabilis (Thunberg, 1787)
Elodes elongata Tournier 1868
Hydrocyphon deflexicollis (Müller, P.W.J 1821)
Microcara testacea (Linnaeus, 1767)
Odeles marginata (Fabricius, 1798)
Prionocyphon serricornis (Müller, 1821)
Scirtes hemisphaericus (Linnaeus, 1758)
Scirtes orbicularis (Panzer, 1793)

Infraorder Scarabaeiformia (scarab beetles)

Family Scarabaeidae

Aegialia arenaria (Fabricius, 1787)
Aphodius ater (DeGeer, 1774)
Aphodius borealis Gyllenhal, 1827
Aphodius conspurcatus (Linnaeus, 1758)
Aphodius constans Duftscmid, 1805
Aphodius contaminatus (Herbst, 1783)
Aphodius depressus (Kugelann, 1792)
Aphodius erraticus (Linnaeus, 1758)
Aphodius fasciatus (Olivier, 1789) nec (Linnaeus, 1758)
Aphodius fimetarius (Linnaeus, 1758
Aphodius foetens (Fabricius, 1787)
Aphodius foetidus (Herbst, 1783)
Aphodius fossor (Linnaeus, 1758)
Aphodius granarius (Linnaeus, 1767)
Aphodius ictericus (Laicharting, 1781)
Aphodius lapponum Gyllenhal, 1806
Aphodius luridus (Fabricius, 1775)
Aphodius merdarius (Fabricius, 1775)
Aphodius plagiatus (Linnaeus, 1767)
Aphodius porcus (Fabricius, 1792)
Aphodius prodromus (Brahm, 1790)
Aphodius pusillus (Herbst, 1789)
Aphodius rufipes (Linnaeus, 1758)
Aphodius scybalarius (Fabricius, 1781)
Aphodius sordidus (Fabricius, 1775)
Aphodius sphacelatus (Panzer, 1798)
Aphodius subterraneus (Linnaeus, 1758)
Aphodius sticticus (Panzer 1798
Cetonia aurata (Linnaeus, 1758
Melolontha hippocastani Fabricius, 1801
Melolontha melolontha (Linnaeus, 1758
Serica brunnea (Linnaeus, 1758
Phyllopertha horticola (Linnaeus, 1758
Onthophagus nuchicornis (Linnaeus, 1758
Onthophagus similis (Scriba, 1790

Family Trogidae
Trox scaber (Linnaeus, 1767)

Family Geotrupidae (earth-boring dung beetles)

Anoplotrupes stercorosus (Scriba, 1791)
Geotrupes spiniger (Marsham, 1802)
Geotrupes stercorarius (Linnaeus, 1758)
Trypocopris vernalis (Linnaeus, 1758)
Typhaeus typhoeus (Linnaeus, 1758)

Family Lucanidae 
Dorcus parallelipipedus (Linnaeus, 1758)
Sinodendron cylindricum (Linnaeus, 1758)

Infraorder Staphyliniformia

Family Histeridae (clown beetles)

Subfamily Abraeinae
Abraeus perpusillus (Marsham, 1802)
Acritus nigricornis (Hoffmann, 1803)
Subfamily Histerinae
Atholus duodecimstriatus (Schrank, 1781)
Atholus bimaculatus (Linnaeus, 1758)
Hister bisexstriatus Fabricius, 1801
Hister unicolor Linnaeus, 1758
Margarinotus brunneus (Fabricius, 1775)
Margarinotus neglectus (Germar, 1813)
Margarinotus purpurascens (Herbst, 1792)
Margarinotus striola (Sahlberg, C.R 1819)
Margarinotus ventralis (Marseul 1854)
Subfamily Onthophilinae
Onthophilus striatus (Forster, 1771)
Subfamily Saprininae
Carcinops pumilio (Erichson, 1834)
Gnathoncus nannetensis (Marseul, 1862)
Gnathoncus rotundatus (Kugelann, 1792)
Hypocaccus dimidiatus (Illiger, 1807)subspecies maritimus (Stephens, 1830)
Hypocaccus rugiceps (Duftschmid, 1805)
Hypocaccus rugifrons (Paykull, 1798)
Saprinus aeneus (Fabricius, 1775)
Saprinus immundus (Gyllenhal, 1827)
Saprinus semistriatus (Scriba, 1790)

Family Silphidae (large carrion beetles, burying beetles)

Nicrophorus humator (Gleditsch, 1767)
Nicrophorus interruptus  Stephens, 1830
Nicrophorus investigator Zetterstedt, 1824
Nicrophorus vespillo (Linnaeus, 1758)
Nicrophorus vespilloides Herbst, 1783
Aclypea opaca (Linnaeus, 1758)
Dendroxena quadrimaculata (Scopoli, 1772)
Necrodes littoralis (Linnaeus, 1758)
Phosphuga atrata (Linnaeus, 1758)subspecies subrotundata  (Leach, 1817)
Silpha tristis Illiger, 1798
Silpha tyrolensis Laicharting, 1781
Thanatophilus dispar (Herbst, 1793)
Thanatophilus rugosus (Linnaeus, 1758)

Ptiliidae (featherwing beetles) 

Subfamily Acrotrichinae
Acrotrichis atomaria (DeGeer, 1774)
Acrotrichis brevipennis (Erichson, 1845)
Acrotrichis chevrolatii (Allibert, 1844)
Acrotrichis cognata (Matthews, 1877)
Acrotrichis danica Sundt, 1958
Acrotrichis dispar (Matthews, 1865)
Acrotrichis fascicularis (Herbst, 1793)
Acrotrichis grandicollis (Mannerheim, 1844)
Acrotrichis insularis (Mäklin, 1852)
Acrotrichis intermedia (Gillmeister, 1845)
Acrotrichis lucidula Rosskothen, 1935
Acrotrichis montandonii (Allibert, 1844)
Acrotrichis parva Rosskothen, 1935
Acrotrichis rosskotheni Sundt, 1971
Acrotrichis rugulosa Rosskothen, 1935
Acrotrichis sericans (Heer, 1841)
Acrotrichis sitkaensis (Motschulsky, 1845)
Acrotrichis strandi Sundt, 1958
Acrotrichis thoracica (Waltl, 1838)
Baeocrara variolosa (Mulsant & Rey, 1873)
Nephanes titan (Newman, 1834)
Subfamily Ptiliinae
Actidium aterrimum (Motschulsky, 1845)
Actidium coarctatum (Haliday, 1855)
Actinopteryx fucicola (Allibert, 1844)
Nossidium pilosellum (Marsham, 1802)
Oligella foveolata (Allibert, 1844)
Ptenidium formicetorum Kraatz, 1851
Ptenidium fuscicorne Erichson, 1845
Ptenidium intermedium Wankowicz, 1869
Ptenidium laevigatum Erichson, 1845
Ptenidium nitidum (Heer, 1841)
Ptenidium punctatum (Gyllenhal, 1827)
Ptenidium pusillum (Gyllenhal, 1808)
Pteryx suturalis (Heer, 1841)
Ptiliola kunzei (Heer, 1841)
Ptiliolum fuscum (Erichson, 1845)
Ptiliolum spencei (Allibert, 1844)
Ptinella aptera (Guérin-Méneville, 1839)
Ptinella cavelli (Broun, 1893)
Ptinella denticollis (Fairmaire, 1858)
Ptinella errabunda Johnson, 1975
Ptinella limbata (Heer, 1841)
Ptinella taylorae Johnson, 1977

Family Hydraenidae (minute moss beetles)

Hydraena britteni (Joy, 1907)
Hydraena flavipes Sturm 1836
Hydraena gracilis Germar, 1824
Hydraena nigrita Germar, 1824
Hydraena pulchella Germar, 1824
Hydraena pygmaea Waterhouse, 1833
Hydraena riparia Kugelann, 1794
Hydraena rufipes Curtis, 1830
Hydraena testacea Curtis, 1830
Limnebius nitidus (Marsham, 1802)
Limnebius truncatellus (Thunberg, 1794)
Enicocerus exsculptus (Germar, 1824)
Ochthebius auriculatus Rey, 1886
Ochthebius bicolon Germar, 1824
Ochthebius dilatatus Stephens, 1829
Ochthebius lejolisii Mulsant & Rey, 1861
Ochthebius marinus (Paykull, 1798)
Ochthebius minimus (Fabricius, 1792)
Ochthebius punctatus Stephens, 1829
Ochthebius viridis Peyron, 1858

Family Hydrophilidae (water scavenger beetles)

Subfamily Hydrophilinae
Anacaena globulus (Paykull, 1798)
Anacaena limbata (Fabricius, 1792)
Anacaena lutescens (Stephens, 1829)
Berosus luridus (Linnaeus, 1761)
Berosus signaticollis (Charpentier, 1825)
Chaetarthria seminulum (Herbst, 1797)
Chaetarthria simillima Vorst & Cuppen, 2003
Cymbiodyta marginellus (Fabricius, 1792)
Enochrus affinis (Thunberg, 1794)
Enochrus bicolor (Fabricius, 1792)
Enochrus coarctatus (Gredler, 1863)
Enochrus fuscipennis (Thomson, 1884)
Enochrus halophilus (Bedel, 1878)
Enochrus melanocephalus (Olivier, 1792)
Enochrus ochropterus (Marsham, 1802)
Enochrus testaceus (Fabricius, 1801)
Helochares punctatus Sharp 1869
Hydrobius fuscipes (Linnaeus, 1758)
Laccobius atratus (Rottenberg, 1874)
Laccobius bipunctatus (Fabricius, 1775)
Laccobius colon (Stephens, 1829)
Laccobius minutus (Linnaeus, 1758)
Laccobius sinuatus Motschulsky, 1849
Laccobius striatulus (Fabricius, 1801)
Laccobius ytenensis Sharp, 1910
Paracymus scutellaris (Rosenhauer, 1856)
Subfamily Sphaeridiinae
Cercyon analis (Paykull, 1798)
Cercyon convexiusculus Stephens, 1829
Cercyon depressus Stephens, 1829
Cercyon haemorrhoidalis (Fabricius, 1775)
Cercyon impressus (Sturm, 1807)
Cercyon lateralis (Marsham, 1802)
Cercyon littoralis (Gyllenhal, 1808)
Cercyon marinus Thomson, 1853
Cercyon melanocephalus (Linnaeus, 1758)
Cercyon nigriceps (Marsham, 1802)
Cercyon obsoletus (Gyllenhal, 1808)
Cercyon pygmaeus (Illiger, 1801)
Cercyon quisquilius (Linnaeus, 1761)
Cercyon sternalis (Sharp, 1918)
Cercyon terminatus (Marsham, 1802)
Cercyon tristis (Illiger, 1801)
Cercyon unipunctatus (Linnaeus, 1758)
Cercyon ustulatus (Preyssler, 1790)
Coelostoma orbiculare (Fabricius, 1775)
Cryptopleurum minutum (Fabricius, 1775)
Cryptopleurum subtile Sharp, 1884 
Megasternum concinnum (Marsham, 1802)
Sphaeridium lunatum Fabricius, 1792
Sphaeridium marginatum Fabricius, 1787
Sphaeridium scarabaeoides (Linnaeus, 1758)

Family Georissidae
Georissus crenulatus (Rossi, 1794)

Family Hydrochidae
Hydrochus brevis (Herbst, 1793)
Hydrochus ignicollis Motschulsky, 1860

Family Helophoridae

Helophorus aequalis Thomson, 1868
Helophorus alternans Gené, 1836
Helophorus arvernicus Mulsant, 1846
Helophorus brevipalpis Bedel, 1881
Helophorus flavipes Fabricius, 1792
Helophorus fulgidicollis Motschulsky, 1860
Helophorus grandis Illiger, 1798
Helophorus granularis (Linnaeus, 1761)
Helophorus griseus Herbst, 1793
Helophorus minutus Fabricius, 1775
Helophorus nanus Sturm, 1836
Helophorus nubilus Fabricius, 1777
Helophorus obscurus Mulsant, 1844
Helophorus porculus Bedel, 1881
Helophorus rufipes (Bosc d'Antic, 1791)
Helophorus strigifrons Thomson, 1868

Family Leiodidae (round fungus beetles)

Subfamily Cholevinae 
Catops chrysomeloides (Panzer, 1798)
Catops fuliginosus Erichson, 1837
Catops fuscus (Panzer, 1794)
Catops grandicollis Erichson, 1837
Catops kirbii (Spence, 1815)
Catops longulus Kellner, 1846
Catops morio (Fabricius, 1787)
Catops nigricans (Spence, 1815)
Catops nigrita Erichson, 1837
Catops tristis (Panzer, 1793)
Choleva agilis (Illiger, 1798)
Choleva angustata (Fabricius, 1781)
Choleva cisteloides (Frölich, 1799)
Nargus velox (Spence, 1815)
Nargus wilkinii (Spence, 1815)
Parabathyscia wollastoni (Jansen, 1857)
Ptomaphagus medius Rey, 1889
Ptomaphagus subvillosus (Goeze, 1777)
Ptomaphagus variicornis (Rosenhauer, 1847)
Sciodrepoides watsoni (Spence, 1815)
Subfamily Coloninae
Colon angulare Erichson, 1837
Colon appendiculatum (Sahlberg, 1822)
Colon brunneum (Latreille, 1807)
Colon dentipes (Sahlberg, 1822)
Colon serripes (Sahlberg, 1822)
Colon viennense Herbst, 1797
Subfamily Leiodinae
Agathidium atrum (Paykull 1798)
Agathidium confusum Brisout, 1863
Agathidium convexum Sharp, 1866
Agathidium laevigatum Erichson, 1845
Agathidium marginatum Sturm, 1807
Agathidium nigripenne (Fabricius, 1792)
Agathidium rotundatum Gyllenhal, 1827
Agathidium seminulum (Linnaeus, 1758)
Agathidium varians Beck, 1817
Amphicyllis globus (Fabricius, 1792)
Anisotoma humeralis (Fabricius, 1792)
Anisotoma orbicularis (Herbst, 1792)
Colenis immunda (Sturm, 1807)
Leiodes badia (Sturm, 1807)
Leiodes calcarata Erichson, 1845
Leiodes cinnamonea (Panzer, 1793)
Leiodes ferruginea (Fabricius, 1787)
Leiodes gyllenhalii Stephens, 1829
Leiodes litura Stephens, 1835
Leiodes longipes (Schmidt, 1841)
Leiodes lucens (Fairmaire, 1855)
Leiodes nigrita (Schmidt, 1841)
Leiodes obesa (Schmidt, 1841)
Leiodes triepkei (Schmidt, 1841)

Family Staphylinidae (rove beetles)

Subfamily Aleocharinae

Acrotona aterrima (Gravenhorst, 1802)
Acrotona muscorum (Brisout, 1860)
Acrotona parvula (Mannerheim, 1830)
Acrotona pygmaea (Gravenhorst, 1802)
Alaobia gagatina (Baudi, 1848)
Alaobia pallidicornis (Thomson, 1856)
Alaobia sodalis (Erichson, 1837)
Alaobia trinotata (Kraatz, 1856)
Aleochara bilineata Gyllenhal, 1810
Aleochara bipustulata (Linnaeus, 1761)
Aleochara brevipennis Gravenhorst, 1806
Aleochara cuniculorum Kraatz, 1858
Aleochara curtula (Goeze, 1777)
Aleochara funebris Wollaston, 1864
Aleochara intricata Mannerheim, 1830
Aleochara lanuginosa Gravenhorst, 1802
Aleochara moerens Gyllenhal, 1827
Aleochara moesta Gravenhorst, 1802
Aleochara sparsa Heer, 1839
Aleochara villosa Mannerheim, 1830
Alevonota rufotestacea (Kraatz, 1856)
Alianta incana (Erichson, 1837)
Aloconota cambrica (Wollaston, 1855)
Aloconota currax (Kraatz, 1856)
Aloconota gregaria (Erichson, 1839)
Aloconota insecta (Thomson, 1856)
Aloconota planifrons (Waterhouse, 1864)
Aloconota sulcifrons (Stephens, 1832)
Amidobia talpa (Heer, 1841)
Amischa analis (Gravenhorst, 1802)
Amischa bifoveolata (Mannerheim, 1830)
Amischa decipiens (Sharp, 1869)
Amischa nigrofusca (Stephens, 1832)
Anomognathus cuspidatus (Erichson, 1839)
Anopleta corvina (Thomson, 1856)
Atheta crassicornis (Fabricius, 1792)
Atheta paracrassicornis Brundin, 1954
Atheta basicornis (Mulsant & Rey, 1852)
Atheta britanniae Bernhauer & Scheerpeltz, 1926
Atheta brunneipennis (Thomson, 1852)
Atheta castanoptera (Mannerheim, 1830)
Atheta cauta (Erichson, 1837)
Atheta coriaria (Kraatz, 1856)
Atheta divisa (Märkel, 1844)
Atheta euryptera (Stephens, 1832)
Atheta fungicola (Thomson, 1852)
Atheta graminicola (Gravenhorst, 1806)
Atheta harwoodi Williams, 1930
Atheta hypnorum (Kiesenwetter, 1850)
Atheta incognita (Sharp, 1869)
Atheta nigricornis (Thomson, 1852)
Atheta nigritula (Gravenhorst, 1802)
Atheta pilicornis (Thomson, 1852)
Atheta ravilla (Erichson, 1839)
Atheta setigera (Sharp, 1869)
Atheta strandiella Brundin, 1954
Atheta triangulum (Kraatz, 1856)
Atheta xanthopus (Thomson, 1856)
Atheta aeneicollis (Sharp, 1869)
Atheta aquatica (Thomson, 1852)
Atheta aquatilis (Thomson, 1867)
Autalia impressa (Olivier, 1795)
Autalia rivularis (Gravenhorst, 1802)
Badura macrocera (Thomson, 1856)
Bessobia excellens (Kraatz, 1856)
Bessobia fungivora (Thomson, 1867)
Bessobia monticola (Thomson, 1852)
Bessobia occulta (Erichson, 1837)
Bolitochara lucida (Gravenhorst, 1802)
Bolitochara obliqua Erichson, 1837
Boreophilia eremita (Rye, 1866)
Brundinia marina (Mulsant & Rey, 1853)
Brundinia meridionalis (Mulsant & Rey, 1853)
Cadaverota cadaverina (Brisout, 1860)
Callicerus obscurus Gravenhorst, 1802
Callicerus rigidicornis Erichson, 1839
Calodera aethiops (Gravenhorst, 1802)
Calodera nigrita Mannerheim, 1830
Calodera protensa Mannerheim, 1830
Calodera riparia Erichson, 1837
Ceritaxa testaceipes (Heer, 1839)
Chaetida longicornis (Gravenhorst, 1802)
Chilomorpha longitarsis (Thomson 1867)
Cordalia obscura (Gravenhorst, 1802)
Crataraea suturalis (Mannerheim, 1830)
Cypha hanseni (Palm, 1949)
Cypha laeviuscula (Mannerheim, 1830)
Cypha longicornis (Paykull, 1800)
Cypha ovulum (Heer, 1839)
Cypha punctum (Motschulsky, 1857)
Cypha seminulum (Erichson, 1839)
Cypha tarsalis (Luze, 1902)
Dacrila fallax (Kraatz, 1856)
Dadobia immersa (Erichson, 1837)
Datomicra canescens (Sharp, 1869)
Datomicra celata (Erichson, 1837)
Datomicra nigra (Kraatz, 1856)
Datomicra sordidula (Erichson, 1837)
Datomicra zosterae (Thomson, 1856)
Diglotta mersa (Haliday, 1837)
Diglotta sinuaticollis (Mulsant & Rey, 1871)
Dilacra luteipes (Erichson, 1837)
Dilacra vilis (Erichson, 1837)
Dimetrota aeneipennis (Thompson, 1856)
Dimetrota atramentaria (Gyllenhal, 1810)
Dimetrota cinnamoptera (Thomson, 1856)
Dimetrota intermedia (Thomson, 1852)
Dimetrota ischnocera Thomson, 1870
Dimetrota laevana (Mulsant & Rey, 1852)
Dimetrota marcida (Erichson, 1837)
Dimetrota nigripes (Thomson, 1856)
Dinaraea aequata (Erichson, 1837)
Dinaraea angustula (Gyllenhal, 1810)
Dinaraea linearis (Gravenhorst, 1802)
Disopora coulsoni (Last, 1952)
Disopora longicollis (Mulsant & Rey, 1852)
Dochmonota clancula (Erichson, 1837)
Drusilla canaliculata (Fabricius, 1787)
Emplenota obscurella (Gravenhorst, 1806)
Enalodroma hepatica (Erichson, 1839)
Encephalus complicans Kirby, 1832
Falagria caesa (Erichson, 1837)
Falagrioma thoracica (Stephens, 1832)
Geostiba circellaris (Gravenhorst, 1806)
Gnypeta caerulea (Sahlberg, 1831)
Gnypeta carbonaria (Mannerheim, 1830)
Gymnusa brevicollis (Paykull, 1800)
Gymnusa variegata Kiesenwetter, 1845
Gyrophaena affinis (Sahlberg, 1830)
Gyrophaena angustata (Stephens, 1832)
Gyrophaena bihamata Thomson, 1867
Gyrophaena fasciata (Marsham, 1802)
Gyrophaena gentilis Erichson, 1839
Gyrophaena hanseni Strand, 1946
Gyrophaena joyi Wendeler, 1924
Gyrophaena latissima (Stephens, 1832)
Gyrophaena minima Erichson, 1837
Gyrophaena nana (Paykull, 1800)
Gyrophaena poweri Crotch, 1866
Gyrophaena pulchella Heer, 1839
Gyrophaena strictula Erichson, 1839
Halobrecta algae (Hardy, 1851)
Halobrecta flavipes Thomson, 1861
Heterota plumbea (Waterhouse, 1858)
Holobus apicatus (Erichson, 1837)
Homalota plana (Gyllenhal, 1810)
Hydrosmecta delicatula (Sharp, 1869)
Hydrosmecta eximia (Sharp, 1869)
Hydrosmecta fragilis (Kraatz, 1854)
Hydrosmecta longula (Heer 1839)
Hydrosmecta septentrionum (Benick, 1969)
Hygronoma dimidiata (Gravenhorst, 1806)
Hygropora cunctans (Erichson, 1837)
Ilyobates nigricollis (Paykull, 1800)
Ischnoglossa prolixa (Gravenhorst, 1802)
Ischnopoda atra (Gravenhorst, 1806)
Ischnopoda constricta (Erichson, 1837)
Ischnopoda leucopus (Marsham, 1802)
Ischnopoda umbratica (Erichson, 1837)
Leptusa fumida (Erichson, 1839)
Leptusa norvegica Strand, 1941
Leptusa pulchella (Mannerheim, 1830)
Liogluta alpestris (Heer, 1839)
Liogluta longiuscula (Gravenhorst, 1802)
Liogluta microptera (Thomson, 1867)
Liogluta pagana (Erichson, 1839)
Meotica apicalis Benick, 1953
Meotica exilis (Knoch, 1806)
Meotica exillima Sharp, 1915
Microdota amicula (Stephens, 1832)
Microdota atricolor (Sharp, 1869)
Microdota benickiella Brundin, 1948
Microdota indubia (Sharp, 1869)
Microdota liliputana (Brisout, 1860)
Microdota subtilis (Scriba, 1866)
Mocyta amplicollis (Mulsant & Rey, 1873)
Mocyta clientula (Erichson, 1839)
Mocyta fungi (Gravenhorst, 1806)
Mocyta orbata (Erichson, 1837)
Mocyta orphana (Erichson, 1837)
Mycetota laticollis (Stephens, 1832)
Myllaena brevicornis (Matthews, 1838)
Myllaena dubia (Gravenhorst, 1806)
Myllaena gracilicornis Fairmaire & Brisout, 1859
Myllaena gracilis (Matthews, 1838)
Myllaena infuscata Kraatz, 1853
Myllaena intermedia Erichson, 1837
Myllaena kraatzi Sharp, 1871
Myllaena minuta (Gravenhorst, 1806)
Myrmecopora brevipes Butler, 1909
Myrmecopora sulcata (Kiesenwetter, 1850)
Myrmecopora uvida (Erichson, 1840)
Nehemitropia lividipennis Mannerheim, 1830
Neohilara subterranea (Mulsant & Rey, 1853)
Notothecta flavipes (Gravenhorst, 1806)
Ocalea latipennis Sharp, 1870
Ocalea picata (Stephens, 1832)
Ocalea rivularis Miller, 1851
Ocyusa maura (Erichson, 1837)
Ocyusa picina (Aubé, 1850)
Oligota granaria Erichson, 1837
Oligota inflata (Mannerheim, 1830)
Oligota parva Kraatz, 1862
Oligota pumilio Kiesenwetter, 1858
Oligota punctulata Heer, 1839
Oligota pusillima (Gravenhorst, 1806)
Oreostiba tibialis (Heer, 1839)
Oxypoda acuminata (Stephens 1832)
Oxypoda alternans (Gravenhorst, 1802)
Oxypoda annularis Mannerheim, 1830
Oxypoda brachyptera (Stephens, 1832)
Oxypoda brevicornis (Stephens 1832)
Oxypoda carbonaria (Heer 1841)
Oxypoda elongatula Aubé, 1850
Oxypoda exoleta Erichson, 1839
Oxypoda flavicornis Kraatz, 1856
Oxypoda formiceticola Märkel, 1841
Oxypoda haemorrhoa (Mannerheim, 1830)
Oxypoda induta Mulsant & Rey, 1861
Oxypoda lentula Erichson, 1837
Oxypoda lurida Wollaston, 1857
Oxypoda opaca (Gravenhorst, 1802)
Oxypoda procerula Mannerheim, 1830
Oxypoda tirolensis Gredler, 1863
Oxypoda umbrata (Gyllenhal, 1810)
Oxypoda vittata Märkel, 1842
Pachnida nigella (Erichson, 1837)
Pachyatheta mortuorum Thomson, 1867
Parameotica difficilis (Brisout, 1860)
Parocyusa longitarsis (Erichson, 1839)
Philhygra arctica (Thomson, 1856)
Philhygra debilis (Erichson, 1837)
Philhygra elongatula (Gravenhorst, 1802)
Philhygra fallaciosa (Sharp, 1869)
Philhygra gyllenhalii (Thomson, 1856)
Philhygra hygrobia (Thomson, 1856)
Philhygra hygrotopora (Kraatz, 1856)
Philhygra luridipennis (Mannerheim, 1830)
Philhygra malleus (Joy, 1913)
Philhygra melanocera (Thomson, 1856)
Philhygra obtusangula (Joy, 1913)
Philhygra palustris (Kiesenwetter, 1844)
Philhygra terminalis (Gravenhorst, 1806)
Philhygra volans (Scriba, 1859)
Phloeopora testacea (Mannerheim, 1830)
Phytosus balticus Kraatz, 1859
Phytosus nigriventris (Chevrolat, 1843)
Phytosus spinifer Curtis, 1838
Plataraea brunnea (Fabricius, 1798)
Polystomota grisea (Kraatz, 1856)
Polystomota punctatella (Motschulsky, 1858)
Schistoglossa aubei (Brisout, 1860)
Schistoglossa gemina (Erichson, 1837)
Thamiaraea hospita (Märkel, 1844)
Thiasophila angulata (Erichson, 1837)
Thinobaena vestita (Gravenhorst, 1806)
Tinotus morion (Gravenhorst, 1802)
Traumoecia picipes (Thomson, 1856)
Zyras collaris (Paykull, 1800)
Zyras limbatus (Paykull, 1789)
Haploglossa nidicola (Fairmaire, 1852)
Haploglossa villosula (Stephens, 1832)

Subfamily Euaesthetinae

Euaesthetus bipunctatus (Ljungh, 1804)
Euaesthetus laeviusculus Mannerheim, 1844
Euaesthetus ruficapillus Lacordaire, 1835

Subfamily Habrocerinae
Habrocerus capillaricornis (Gravenhorst, 1806)
Subfamily Micropeplinae

Micropeplus caelatus Erichson, 1839
Micropeplus fulvus Erichson, 1840
Micropeplus porcatus (Paykull, 1789)
Micropeplus staphylinoides (Marsham, 1802)
Micropeplus tesserula Curtis, 1828
 
Subfamily Omaliinae

Acidota crenata (Fabricius, 1792)
Acidota cruentata Mannerheim, 1830
Acrolocha sulcula (Stephens, 1834)
Acrulia inflata (Gyllenhal, 1813)
Anthobium atrocephalum (Gyllenhal, 1827)
Anthobium unicolor (Marsham, 1802)
Anthophagus alpinus (Paykull, 1790)
Coryphium angusticolle Stephens, 1834
Deliphrum tectum (Paykull, 1789)
Eucnecosum brachypterum (Gravenhorst, 1802)
Eusphalerum luteum (Marsham, 1802)
Eusphalerum minutum (Fabricius, 1792)
Eusphalerum primulae (Stephens, 1834)
Geodromicus nigrita (Müller, 1821)
Hapalaraea pygmaea (Paykull, 1800)
Lesteva hanseni Lohse, 1953
Lesteva longoelytrata (Goeze, 1777)
Lesteva monticola Kiesenwetter, 1847
Lesteva pubescens Mannerheim, 1830
Lesteva punctata Erichson, 1839
Lesteva sicula Erichson, 1840
Lesteva heeri Fauvel, 1872
Micralymma marina (Ström, 1783)
Olophrum fuscum (Gravenhorst, 1806)
Olophrum piceum (Gyllenhal, 1810)
Omalium allardi Fairmaire & Brisout, 1859
Omalium caesum Gravenhorst, 1806
Omalium excavatum Stephens, 1834
Omalium exiguum Gyllenhal, 1810
Omalium italicum Bernhauer, 1902
Omalium laeviusculum Gyllenhal, 1827
Omalium oxyacanthae Gravenhorst, 1806
Omalium riparium Thomson, 1857
Omalium rivulare (Paykull, 1789)
Omalium rugatum Rey, 1880
Omalium rugulipenne Rye, 1864
Omalium septentrionis Thomson, 1857
Philorinum sordidum (Stephens, 1832)
Phloeonomus punctipennis Thomson, 1867
Phloeonomus pusillus (Gravenhorst, 1806)
Phloeostiba plana (Paykull, 1792)
Phyllodrepa devillei (Bernhauer, 1902)
Phyllodrepa gracilicornis (Fairmaire & Laboulbène, 1856)
Phyllodrepa ioptera (Stephens, 1834)
Phyllodrepa vilis (Erichson, 1840)
Phyllodrepa floralis (Paykull, 1789)
Phyllodrepa puberula Bernhauer, 1903
Phyllodrepoidea crenata (Gravenhorst, 1802)
Xylodromus bruneipennis (Stephens, 1832)
Xylodromus depressus (Gravenhorst, 1802)

Subfamily Oxytelinae

Anotylus complanatus (Erichson, 1839)
Anotylus insecatus (Gravenhorst, 1806)
Anotylus inustus (Gravenhorst, 1806)
Anotylus maritimus (Thomson, 1861)
Anotylus nitidulus (Gravenhorst, 1802)
Anotylus rugosus (Fabricius, 1775)
Anotylus sculpturatus (Gravenhorst, 1806)
Anotylus tetracarinatus (Block, 1799)
Bledius annae Sharp, 1911
Bledius erraticus Erichson, 1839
Bledius femoralis Gyllenhal, 1827
Bledius fergussoni Joy, 1912
Bledius furcatus (Olivier, 1812)
Bledius fuscipes Rye, 1865
Bledius gallicus (Gravenhorst, 1806)
Bledius limicola Tottenham, 1940
Bledius longulus Erichson, 1839
Bledius occidentalis Bondroit, 1907
Bledius opacus (Block, 1799)
Bledius praetermissus Williams, 1929
Bledius subniger Schneider, 1900
Bledius subterraneus Erichson, 1839
Bledius unicornis (Germar, 1825)
Carpelimus bilineatus Stephens, 1834
Carpelimus corticinus (Gravenhorst, 1806)
Carpelimus elongatulus (Erichson, 1839)
Carpelimus fuliginosus (Gravenhorst, 1802)
Carpelimus gracilis (Mannerheim, 1830)
Carpelimus impressus (Lacordaire, 1835)
Carpelimus obesus (Kiesenwetter, 1844)
Carpelimus pusillus (Gravenhorst, 1802)
Carpelimus rivularis (Motschulsky, 1860)
Carpelimus similis Smetana, 1967
Carpelimus subtilicornis (Roubal, 1946)
Coprophilus striatulus (Fabricius, 1792)
Deleaster dichrous (Gravenhorst, 1802)
Ochthephilus aureus (Fauvel, 1871)
Ochthephilus omalinus (Erichson, 1840)
Oxytelus laqueatus (Marsham, 1802)
Oxytelus sculptus Gravenhorst, 1806
Platystethus arenarius (Geoffroy, 1785)
Platystethus cornutus (Gravenhorst, 1802)
Platystethus nodifrons Mannerheim, 1830
Syntomium aeneum (Müller, 1821)
Teropalpus unicolor (Sharp, 1900)
Thinobius bicolor Joy, 1911
Thinobius longipennis sensu lato 
Thinodromus arcuatus (Stephens, 1834)
 
Subfamily Paederinae

Astenus lyonessius (Joy, 1908)
Lathrobium angusticolle Lacordaire, 1835
Lathrobium boreale Hochhuth, 1851
Lathrobium brunnipes (Fabricius, 1792)
Lathrobium elongatum (Linnaeus, 1767)
Lathrobium fovulum Stephens, 1833
Lathrobium fulvipenne Gravenhorst, 1806
Lathrobium impressum Heer, 1841
Lathrobium longulum Gravenhorst, 1802
Lathrobium multipunctum Gravenhorst, 1802
Lathrobium pallidipenne Hochhuth 1851
Lathrobium quadratum (Paykull, 1789)
Lathrobium rufipenne Gyllenhal, 1813
Lathrobium terminatum Gravenhorst, 1802
Lathrobium zetterstedti Rye, 1872
Lithocharis nigriceps Kraatz, 1859
Lithocharis ochracea (Gravenhorst, 1802)
Medon ripicola (Kraatz, 1854)
Ochthephilum fracticorne (Paykull, 1800)
Paederus caligatus Erichson, 1840
Paederus fuscipes Curtis, 1826
Paederus riparius (Linnaeus, 1758)
Pseudomedon obsoleta (Nordmann, 1837)
Rugilus erichsoni (Fauvel, 1867)
Rugilus geniculatus (Erichson, 1839)
Rugilus orbiculatus (Paykull, 1789)
Rugilus rufipes Germar, 1836
Rugilus similis (Erichson, 1839)
Scopaeus gracilis (Sperk, 1835)
Scopaeus sulcicollis (Stephens, 1833)
Sunius melanocephalus (Fabricius, 1792)
Sunius propinquus (Brisout, 1847)

Subfamily Phloeocharinae
Phloeocharis subtilissima Mannerheim, 1830
Subfamily Piestinae
Siagonium quadricorne Kirby, 1815
Subfamily Proteininae

Megarthrus bellevoyi (Saulcy 1862)
Megarthrus denticollis (Beck, 1817)
Megarthrus depressus (Paykull, 1789)
Metopsia clypeata (Müller 1821)
Proteinus atomarius Erichson, 1840
Proteinus brachypterus (Fabricius, 1792)
Proteinus laevigatus Hochhuth, 1871
Proteinus ovalis Stephens, 1834
 
Subfamily Pseudopsinae
Pseudopsis sulcata Newman, 1834
Subfamily Staphylininae

Atrecus affinis (Paykull, 1789)
Bisnius cephalotes (Gravenhorst, 1802)
Bisnius fimetarius (Gravenhorst, 1802)
Bisnius nigriventris Thomson, 1867
Bisnius puella Nordmann, 1837
Bisnius sordidus (Gravenhorst, 1802)
Cafius fucicola Curtis, 1830
Cafius sericeus (Holme, 1837)
Cafius xantholoma (Gravenhorst, 1806)
Creophilus maxillosus (Linnaeus, 1758)
Dinothenarus pubescens (DeGeer, 1774)
Erichsonius cinerascens (Gravenhorst, 1802)
Gabrius bishopi Sharp, 1910
Gabrius breviventer (Sperk 1835)
Gabrius keysianus Sharp, 1910
Gabrius nigritulus (Gravenhorst, 1802)
Gabrius osseticus (Kolenati, 1846)
Gabrius piliger Mulsant & Rey, 1876
Gabrius splendidulus (Gravenhorst, 1802)
Gabrius subnigritulus (Reitter, 1909)
Gabrius trossulus (Nordmann, 1837)
Gabrius velox Sharp, 1910
Gabronthus thermarum (Aubé, 1850)
Gauropterus fulgidus (Fabricius, 1787)
Gyrohypnus angustatus Stephens, 1833
Gyrohypnus fracticornis (Müller, 1776)
Gyrohypnus punctulatus (Paykull, 1789)
Heterothops binotatus (Gravenhorst, 1802)
Heterothops minutus Wollaston, 1860
Heterothops niger Kraatz, 1868
Heterothops praevius Erichson, 1839
Leptacinus batychrus (Gyllenhal, 1827)
Leptacinus pusillus (Stephens, 1833)
Megalinus glabratus (Gravenhorst, 1802)
Neobisnius lathrobioides (Baudi, 1848)
Neobisnius procerulus (Gravenhorst, 1806)
Neobisnius villosulus (Stephens, 1833)
Ocypus aeneocephalus (DeGeer, 1774)
Ocypus ater (Gravenhorst, 1802)
Ocypus brunnipes (Fabricius, 1781)
Ocypus fortunatarum (Wollaston, 1871)
Ocypus globulifer Geoffroy, 1785)
Ocypus melanarius (Heer, 1839)
Ocypus morsitans (Rossi, 1790)
Ocypus olens (Müller, 1764)
Ocypus nitens (Schrank 1781)
Ontholestes murinus (Linnaeus, 1758)
Ontholestes tesselatus Stephens, 1829
Othius angustus Stephens, 1833
Othius laeviusculus Stephens, 1833
Othius punctulatus (Goeze, 1777)
Othius subuliformis Stephens 1833
Phacophallus parumpunctatus (Gyllenhal, 1827)
Philonthus addendus Sharp, 1867
Philonthus albipes (Gravenhorst, 1802)
Philonthus carbonarius (Gravenhorst, 1802)
Philonthus cognatus Stephens, 1832
Philonthus concinnus (Gravenhorst, 1802)
Philonthus corvinus Erichson, 1839
Philonthus cruentatus (Gmelin, 1790)
Philonthus debilis (Gravenhorst, 1802)
Philonthus decorus (Gravenhorst, 1802)
Philonthus discoideus (Gravenhorst, 1802)
Philonthus ebeninus (Gravenhorst, 1802)
Philonthus fumarius (Gravenhorst, 1806)
Philonthus furcifer Renkonen, 1937
Philonthus intermedius (Lacordaire, 1835)
Philonthus jurgans Tottenham, 1937
Philonthus laminatus (Creutzer, 1799)
Philonthus lepidus (Gravenhorst, 1802)
Philonthus longicornis Stephens, 1832
Philonthus mannerheimi Fauvel, 1868
Philonthus marginatus (Ström, 1768)
Philonthus micans (Gravenhorst, 1802)
Philonthus micantoides Benick & Lohse, 1956
Philonthus nigrita (Gravenhorst, 1806)
Philonthus nitidicollis (Boisduval & Lacordaire, 1835)
Philonthus parvicornis (Gravenhorst, 1802)
Philonthus politus (Linnaeus, 1758)
Philonthus punctus (Gravenhorst, 1802)
Philonthus quisquiliarius (Gyllenhal, 1810)
Philonthus rectangulus Sharp, 1874
Philonthus rotundicollis (Ménétriés, 1832)
Philonthus sanguinolentus (Gravenhorst, 1802)
Philonthus splendens (Fabricius, 1792)
Philonthus succicola Thomson, 1860
Philonthus tenuicornis Mulsant & Rey, 1853
Philonthus umbratilis (Gravenhorst, 1802)
Philonthus varians (Paykull, 1789)
Philonthus ventralis (Gravenhorst, 1802)
Quedius assimilis (Nordmann, 1837)
Quedius auricomus Kiesenwetter, 1850
Quedius boopoides Munster, 1923
Quedius boops (Gravenhorst, 1802)
Quedius brevicornis (Thomson, 1860)
Quedius brevis Erichson, 1840
Quedius cinctus (Paykull, 1790)
Quedius cruentus (Olivier, 1795)
Quedius curtipennis Bernhauer, 1908
Quedius fuliginosus (Gravenhorst, 1802)
Quedius fulvicollis (Stephens, 1833)
Quedius fumatus (Stephens, 1833)
Quedius humeralis Stephens, 1832
Quedius invreae Gridelli, 1924
Quedius longicornis Kraatz, 1857
Quedius maurorufus (Gravenhorst, 1806)
Quedius mesomelinus (Marsham, 1802)
Quedius molochinus (Gravenhorst, 1806)
Quedius nigriceps Kraatz, 1857
Quedius nitipennis (Stephens, 1833)
Quedius pallipes Lucas, 1849
Quedius persimilis Mulsant & Rey 1876
Quedius picipes (Mannerheim, 1830)
Quedius plagiatus Mannerheim, 1843
Quedius puncticollis Thomson, 1867
Quedius schatzmayri Gridelli, 1922
Quedius scintillans (Gravenhorst, 1806)
Quedius semiaeneus (Stephens, 1833)
Quedius semiobscurus (Marsham, 1802)
Quedius tristis (Gravenhorst, 1802)
Quedius truncicola Fairmaire & Laboulbène, 1856
Quedius umbrinus Erichson, 1839
Staphylinus dimidiaticornis Gemminger, 1851
Staphylinus erythropterus Linnaeus, 1758
Xantholinus elegans (Oliver 1795)
Xantholinus laevigatus Jacobson, 1847
Xantholinus linearis (Olivier, 1794)
Xantholinus longiventris Heer, 1839
 
Subfamily Steninae

Dianous coerulescens (Gyllenhal, 1810)
Stenus aceris Stephens, 1833
Stenus argus Gravenhorst, 1806
Stenus bifoveolatus Gyllenhal, 1827
Stenus bimaculatus Gyllenhal, 1810
Stenus binotatus Ljungh, 1804
Stenus boops Ljungh, 1810
Stenus brevipennis Thomson, 1851
Stenus brunnipes Stephens, 1833
Stenus canaliculatus Gyllenhal, 1827
Stenus carbonarius Gyllenhal, 1827
Stenus cicindeloides (Schaller, 1783)
Stenus clavicornis (Scopoli, 1763)
Stenus crassus Stephens, 1833
Stenus europaeus Puthz, 1966
Stenus exiguus Erichson, 1840
Stenus flavipes Stephens, 1833
Stenus formicetorum Mannerheim, 1843
Stenus fornicatus Stephens, 1833
Stenus fulvicornis Stephens, 1833
Stenus fuscipes Gravenhorst, 1802
Stenus geniculatus Gravenhorst, 1806
Stenus glabellus Thomson, 1870
Stenus glacialis Heer, 1839
Stenus guttula Müller, 1821
Stenus guynemeri Jacquelin du Val, 1850
Stenus impressus Germar, 1824
Stenus incanus Erichson, 1839
Stenus incrassatus Erichson, 1839
Stenus juno (Paykull, 1789)
Stenus kiesenwetteri Rosenhauer, 1856
Stenus latifrons Erichson, 1839
Stenus lustrator Erichson, 1839
Stenus melanarius Stephens, 1833
Stenus melanopus (Marsham, 1802)
Stenus nanus Stephens, 1833
Stenus nigritulus Gyllenhal, 1827
Stenus nitens Stephens, 1833
Stenus nitidiusculus Stephens, 1833
Stenus opticus Gravenhorst, 1806
Stenus ossium Stephens, 1833
Stenus pallitarsis Stephens, 1833
Stenus palposus Zetterstedt, 1838
Stenus palustris Erichson, 1839
Stenus picipennis Erichson, 1840
Stenus picipes Stephens, 1833
Stenus providus Erichson, 1839
Stenus pubescens Stephens, 1833
Stenus pusillus Stephens, 1833
Stenus similis (Herbst, 1784)
Stenus solutus Erichson, 1840
Stenus tarsalis Ljungh, 1810
Stenus umbratilis Casey, 1884

Subfamily Tachyporinae

Bolitobius castaneus (Stephens, 1832)
Bolitobius cingulatus Mannerheim, 1830
Bryophacis crassicornis (Mäklin 1847)
Cilea silphoides (Linnaeus, 1767)
Ischnosoma longicorne Mäklin, 1847
Ischnosoma splendidum (Gravenhorst, 1806)
Lamprinodes saginatus (Gravenhorst, 1806)
Lordithon exoletus (Erichson, 1839)
Lordithon lunulatus (Linnaeus, 1761)
Lordithon thoracicus (Fabricius, 1777)
Lordithon trinotatus (Erichson, 1839)
Mycetoporus angularis Mulsant & Rey, 1853
Mycetoporus clavicornis (Stephens, 1832)
Mycetoporus despectus Strand, 1969
Mycetoporus erichsonanus Fagel, 1965
Mycetoporus lepidus (Gravenhorst, 1806)
Mycetoporus longulus Mannerheim, 1830
Mycetoporus nigricollis (Stephens, 1835)
Mycetoporus punctus (Gravenhorst, 1806)
Mycetoporus rufescens (Stephens, 1832)
Parabolitobius inclinans (Gravenhorst, 1806)
Sepedophilus immaculatus (Stephens, 1832)
Sepedophilus littoreus (Linnaeus, 1758)
Sepedophilus marshami (Stephens, 1832)
Sepedophilus nigripennis (Stephens, 1832)
Sepedophilus pedicularius (Gravenhorst, 1802)
Tachinus elongatus Gyllenhal, 1810
Tachinus humeralis Gravenhorst, 1802
Tachinus laticollis Gravenhorst, 1802
Tachinus marginellus (Fabricius, 1781)
Tachinus pallipes (Gravenhorst, 1806)
Tachinus proximus Kraatz, 1855
Tachinus signatus Gravenhorst, 1802
Tachinus subterraneus (Linnaeus, 1758)
Tachyporus atriceps Stephens, 1832
Tachyporus chrysomelinus (Linnaeus, 1758)
Tachyporus dispar (Paykull, 1789)
Tachyporus formosus Matthews, 1838
Tachyporus hypnorum (Fabricius, 1775)
Tachyporus nitidulus (Fabricius, 1781)
Tachyporus obtusus (Linnaeus, 1767)
Tachyporus pallidus Sharp, 1871
Tachyporus pusillus Gravenhorst, 1806
Tachyporus solutus Erichson, 1840
Tachyporus tersus Erichson, 1839
Tachyporus transversalis Gravenhorst, 1806

Subfamily Pselaphinae

Bibloplectus ambiguus (Reichenbach, 1816)
Bibloplectus pusillus (Denny, 1825)
Bibloplectus spinosus Raffray, 1914
Bibloporus bicolor (Denny, 1825)
Brachygluta fossulata (Reichenbach, 1816)
Brachygluta haematica (Reichenbach, 1816)
Brachygluta helferi (Schmidt-Göbel, 1836)
Brachygluta waterhousei (Rye 1869)
Bryaxis bulbifer (Reichenbach, 1816)
Bryaxis curtisii (Leach, 1817)
Bryaxis puncticollis (Denny, 1825)
Bythinus burrellii Denny, 1825
Bythinus macropalpus Aubé, 1833
Claviger testaceus Preyssler, 1790
Euplectus bescidicus Reitter, 1881
Euplectus duponti Aubé, 1833
Euplectus infirmus Raffray, 1910
Euplectus karstenii (Reichenbach, 1816)
Euplectus mutator Fauvel 1895
Euplectus piceus Motschulsky, 1835
Euplectus punctatus Mulsant, 1861
Euplectus sanguineus Denny, 1825
Pselaphaulax dresdensis Herbst, 1792
Pselaphus heisei Herbst, 1792
Reichenbachia juncorum (Leach, 1817)
Rybaxis laminata (Motschulsky, 1836)
Rybaxis longicornis (Leach, 1817)
Trissemus impressa (Panzer, 1803)
Tychus niger (Paykull, 1800)

Subfamily Scydmaeninae

Cephennium gallicum (Ganglbauer, 1899)
Euconnus fimetarius (Chaudoir, 1845)
Euconnus hirticollis (Illiger, 1798)
Eutheia plicata (Gyllenhal, 1813)
Neuraphes angulatus (Müller & Künze, 1822)
Neuraphes elongatulus (Müller & Künze, 1822)
Neuraphes talparum Lokay, 1920
Scydmaenus tarsatus Müller & Kunze, 1822
Scydmoraphes sparshalli (Denny, 1825)
Stenichnus bicolor (Denny, 1825)
Stenichnus collaris (Müller & Künze, 1822)
Stenichnus poweri (Fowler, 1884)
Stenichnus pusillus (Müller & Künze, 1822)

Subfamily Scaphidiinae
Scaphisoma agaricinum (Linnaeus, 1758)
Scaphisoma agaricinum (Linnaeus, 1758)

See also

List of beetles of Great Britain
List of subgroups of the order Coleoptera
Royal Entomological Society Handbooks Out of print parts available as free pdfs  are:
Vol 4 Part 1. Coleoptera, Introduction and keys to families. R. A. Crowson
Vol 4 Part 2. Coleoptera. Carabidae. Carl H. Lindroth
Vol 4 Part 3. Coleoptera. Hydradephaga. F. Balfour-Browne
Vol 4 Part 8a. Coleoptera. Staphylinidae. Section (a) Piestinae to Euaesthetinae. C. E. Tottenham
Vol 4 Part 9. Coleoptera (Pselaphidae). E. J. Pearce
Vol 4 Part 10. Coleoptera. Histeroidea. D. G. H. Halstead
Vol 5 Part 1b. Coleoptera. Buprestidae. Brian Levey
Vol 5 Part 2c. Coleoptera - Heteroceridae. R. O. S. Clarke
Vol 5 Part 3. Adults and Larvae of Hide, Larder and Carpet Beetles and their relatives (Coloptera: Dermestidiae) and of Derodontid Beetles (Coleoptera: Derodontidae). Main text. E. R. Peacock
Vol 5 Part 3. Adults and Larvae of Hide, Larder and Carpet Beetles and their relatives (Coleoptera: Dermestidiae) and of Derodontid Beetles (Coleoptera: Derodontidae). Figures index. E. R. Peacock
Vol 5 Part 5a. Coleoptera. Rhizophagidae. Enid R. Peacock
Vol 5 Part 5b. Coleoptera. Phalacridae. R. T. Thompson
Vol 5 Part 7. Coleoptera - Coccinellidae & Sphindidae. R. D. Pope
Vol 5 Part 9. Coleoptera. F. D. Buck
Vol 5 Part 10. Coleoptera - Tenebrionidae. M. J. D. Brendell
Vol 5 Part 11 ed1. Coleoptera. Scarabaeoidea (lucanidae, Trogidae, Geotrupidae, Scarabaeidae) E. B. Britton
Vol 5 Part 11. Dung Beetles & chafers - Coleoptera: Scarabaeoidea. L. Jessop
Vol 5 Part 12. Coleoptera. Cerambycidae. E. A. J. Duffy
Vol 5 Part 15. Coleoptera. Scolytidae and Platypodidae. E. A. J. Duffy

Encyclopedia of Life online has many images via search

References

Invertebrate Ireland

Further reading
du Chatenet, G, 2000, Coléoptères Phytophages D’Europe, NAP Editions
Fowler, William Weekes and Donisthorpe, Horace St. John Kelly. The Coleoptera of the British islands. A descriptive account of the families, genera, and species indigenous to Great Britain and Ireland, with notes as to localities, habitats, etc.London :L. Reeve & Co., 1887-1913.5 Volumes online
Johnson, F.W & Halbert, J.N, 1902, A list of the Beetles of Ireland, Proceedings of the Royal Irish Academy, 6B: 535-827
Joy, N.H., 1932, A practical handbook of British beetles H.F. & G. Witherby
 Löbl, I. & Smetana A. Eds Catalogue of Palaearctic Coleoptera

External links
 Fotosammlung zur Vorbestimmung Image gallery Central Europe
 Die Käfer Europas
 www.koleopterologie.de Käfer-Galerie Central Europe
 Atlas of the Beetles of Russia
 Biolib taxonomy, images
 Generi di Staphylinidae
 Faune de France Insectes Coléoptères pdfs free downloads

Ireland, beetles
beetles
Ireland